= Fauna of Italy =

Native animals of Italy

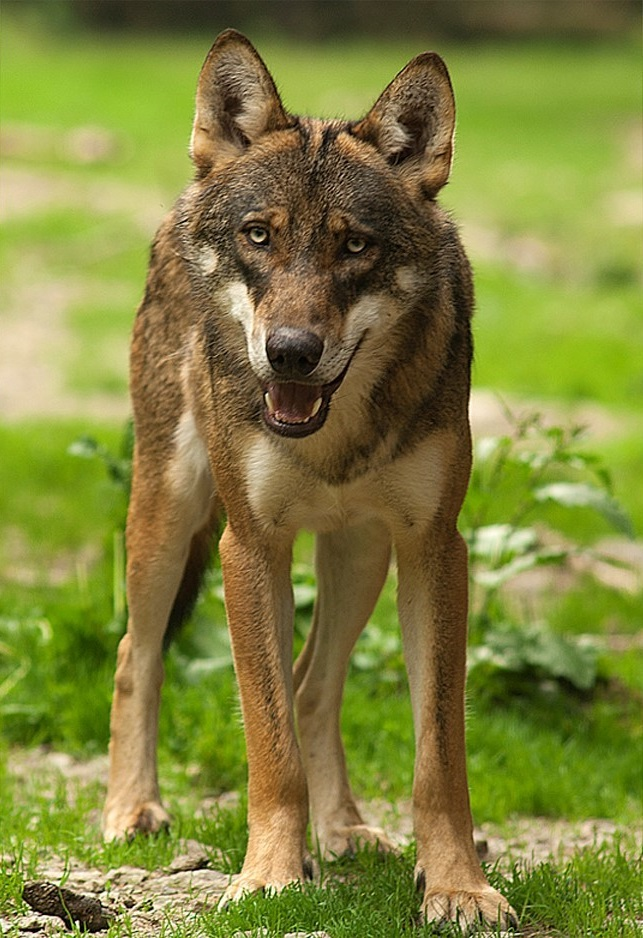
The Italian wolf, which inhabits the Apennine Mountains and the Western Alps, features prominently in Latin and Italian cultures, such as in the legend of the founding of Rome. It is the national animal of Italy.

The fauna of Italy comprises all the animal species inhabiting the territory of the Italian Republic and its surrounding waters. Italy has the highest level of faunal biodiversity in Europe, with over 57,000 species recorded, representing more than a third of all European fauna. This is due to various factors. The Italian peninsula is in the centre of the Mediterranean Sea, forming a corridor between central Europe and North Africa, and it has 8,000 km (5,000 mi) of coastline. Italy also receives species from the Balkans, Eurasia, and the Middle East. Italy's varied geological structure, including the Alps and the Apennines, Central Italian woodlands, and Southern Italian Garigue and Maquis shrubland, also contribute to high climate and habitat diversity.

The fauna of Italy includes 4,777 endemic animal species, which include the Sardinian long-eared bat, Sardinian red deer, spectacled salamander, brown cave salamander, Italian newt, Italian frog, Apennine yellow-bellied toad, Italian wall lizard, Aeolian wall lizard, Sicilian wall lizard, Italian Aesculapian snake, and Sicilian pond turtle. In Italy, there are 119 mammals species, 550 bird species, 69 reptile species, 39 amphibian species, 623 fish species and 56,213 invertebrate species, of which 37,303 insect species.

== Biodiversity ==
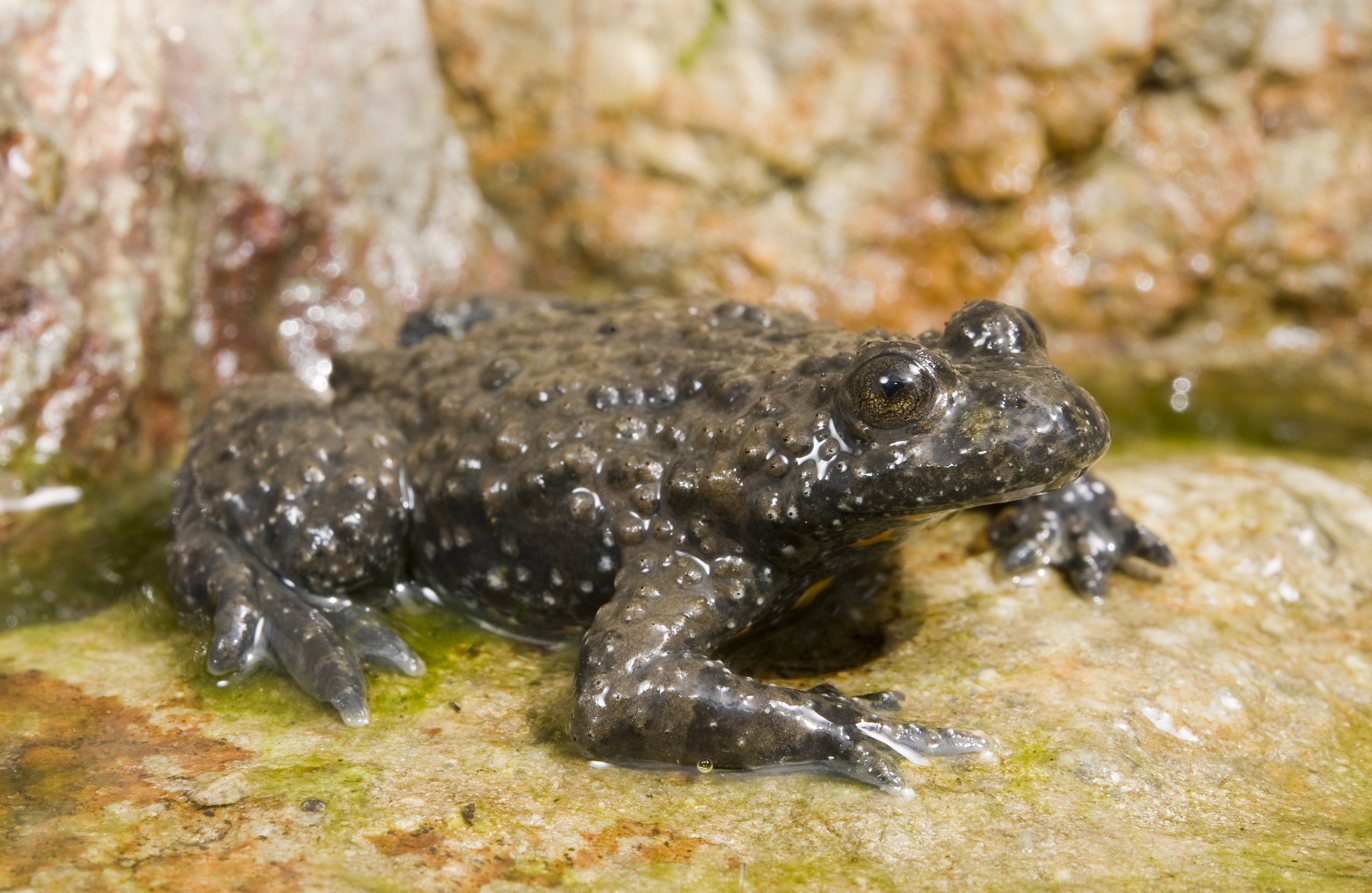
Apennine yellow-bellied toad

Italy is probably the richest European country in both plant and animal biodiversity, with a population very rich in endemic forms. It has the highest number and density of both animal and plant species within the European Union. During the Pleistocene glaciations, the Italian territory remained largely free of ice, which allowed the flora and fauna to survive, something that did not happen in the central-northern areas of the continent, and the retreat of the great glaciers has left glacial relict fauna in some mountain locations.

The Italian territory extends over about 10° of latitude, therefore, while remaining in the context of temperate climates without extremes of heat, cold or aridity, the climatic difference between the north and the south of the country is not at all negligible, going from the nival climates of the Alpine peaks to the cool semi-continental temperate climate of the Po Valley, to the Mediterranean climate of the central-southern coasts and the islands. Italy is predominantly hilly and mountainous in nature of the territory, which has caused a proliferation of ecological niches, close in space but very diversified.

== Geography and climate ==
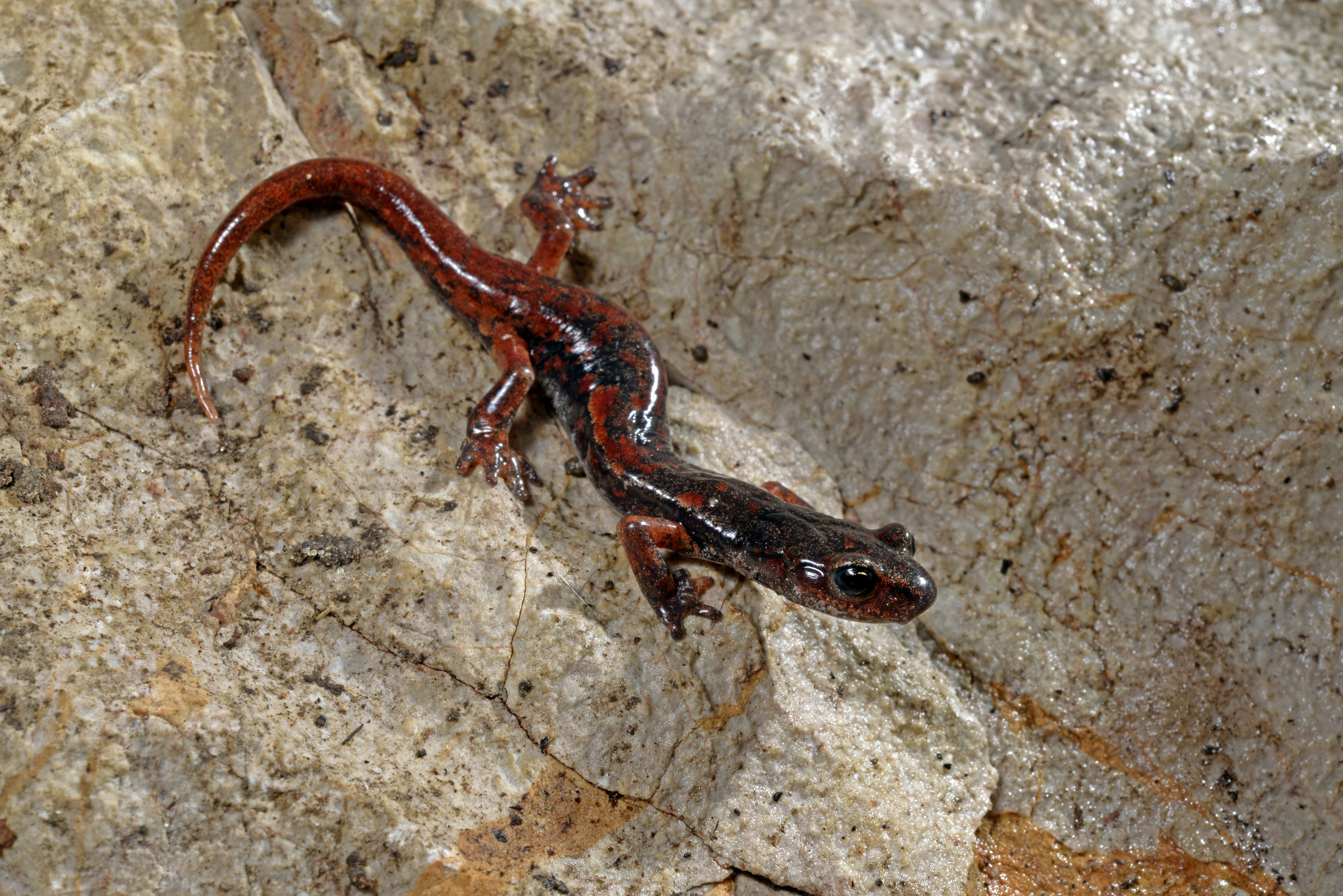
Italian cave salamander

Italy consists of a 1,000 km (620 miles) long peninsula extending out into the central Mediterranean, together with a number of islands to the south and west. The Apennines run north-south through the peninsula connecting the Alps in the north to Etna and the Peloritani mountains in Sicily in the south. The geology is diverse.

Northern Italy is dominated by the Alps and an extensive valley of the Po river which is extensively agricultural and industrialised. Central Italy includes the regions of Tuscany, Umbria, Marche and Lazio. It is dominated by the Apennines, from which a few major rivers flow. There are few natural plains. A process of land reclamation has replaced the coastal swamps and marshes with agricultural land.

Southern Italy includes the regions of Abruzzo, Molise, Apulia, Basilicata, Campania and Calabria. Agriculture and industry are less developed. The main islands are Sicily, Sardinia and the Aeolian Islands.

Because of the length of the Italian Peninsula and the mostly mountainous hinterland, the climate of Italy is highly diverse. In most of the inland northern and central regions, the climate ranges from humid subtropical to humid continental and oceanic. In particular, the climate of the Po Valley geographical region is mostly continental, with harsh winters and hot summers. The coastal areas of Liguria, Tuscany and most of the South generally fit the Mediterranean climate stereotype (Köppen climate classification). Each region has a distinct fauna.

== Ecoregions ==
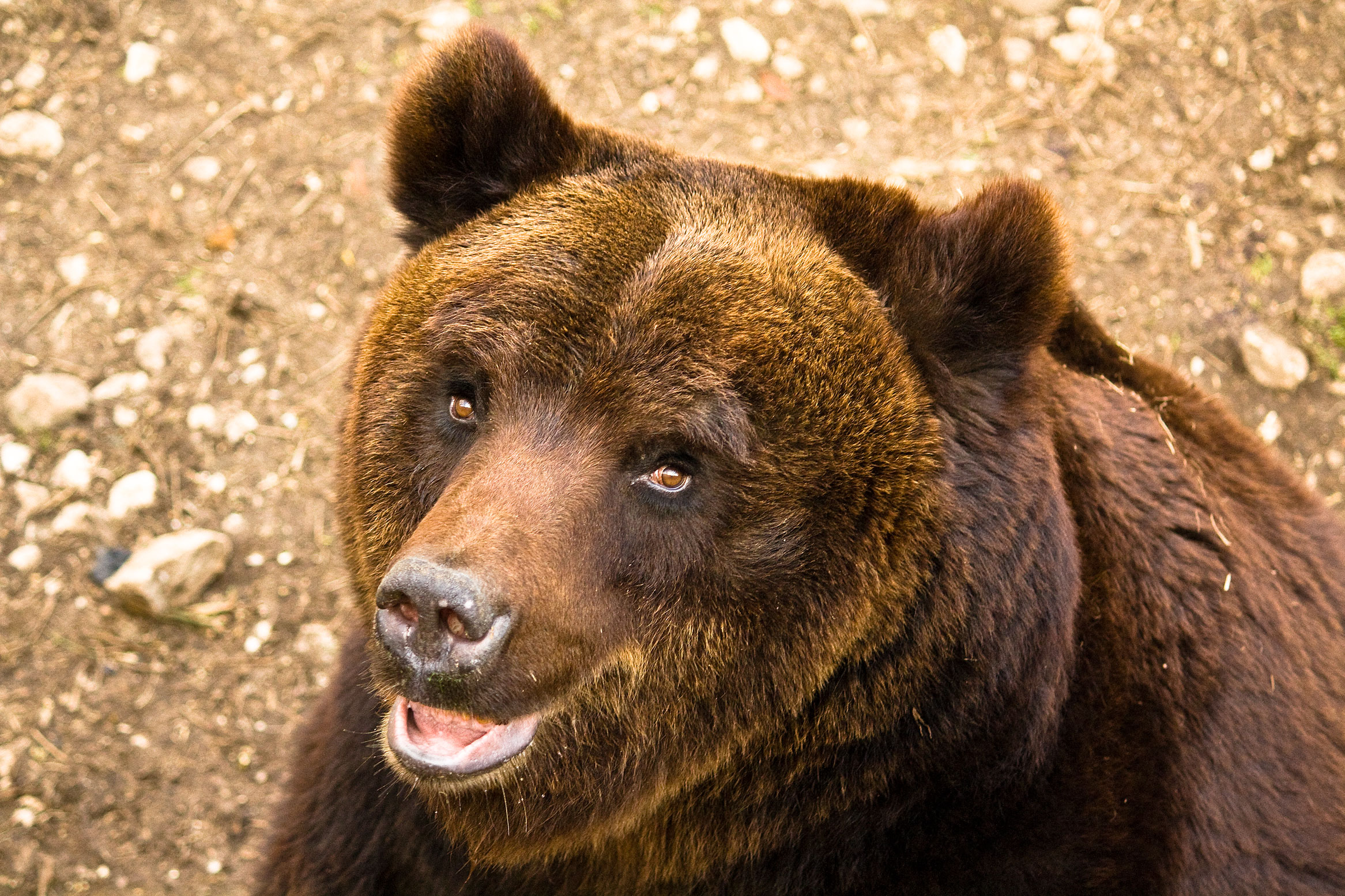
Marsican brown bear

An ecoregion is an ecologically and geographically defined area with characteristic species. Most of the Italian territory is included in the Mediterranean Basin. Important Italian terrestrial ecoregions include the Illyrian deciduous forests, the Italian sclerophyllous and semi-deciduous forests, the South Apennine mixed montane forests, the Tyrrhenian-Adriatic sclerophyllous and mixed forests, Apennine deciduous montane forests, the Dinaric Mountains mixed forests and the Po Basin mixed forests. There are also many cave systems significant for biodiversity.

== Endemic species ==
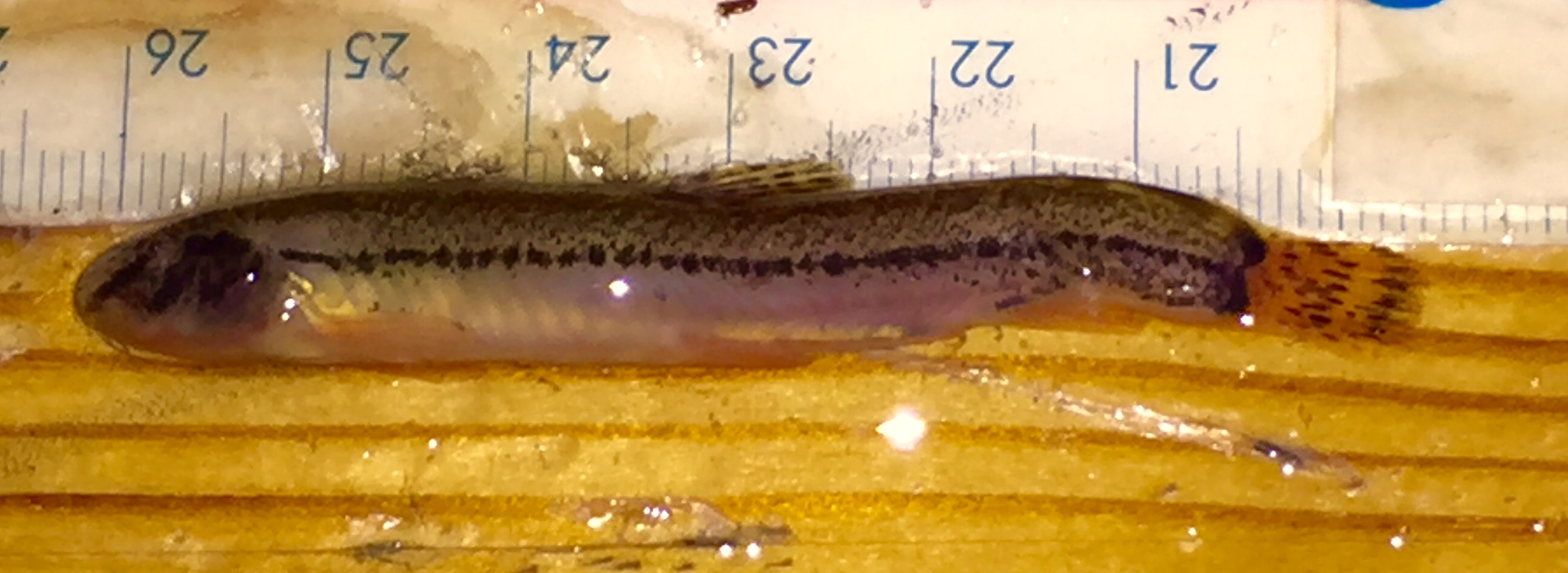
Italian loach

The Checklist of the Species of the Italian Fauna includes 4,777 endemic animal species in Italy.

Unique mammals include the Corsican hare, the Sardinian long-eared bat, the Apennine shrew, the Udine shrew, the Calabria pine vole, the Mesola deer, and the Sardinian deer.

Endemic amphibians and reptiles include the spectacled salamander, the Sardinian cave salamander, the Italian cave salamander, the Monte Albo cave salamander, the Sardinian brook newt, the Italian newt, the Italian frog, the Apennine yellow-bellied toad, the Sicilian green toad, the Aeolian wall lizard, the Sicilian wall lizard, the Italian Aesculapian snake, and the Sicilian pond turtle (Emys trinacris).

Endemic fishes include the Bergatino loach, the Italian barbel, the brook chub, the Arno goby, the Garda carp, the carpione del Fibreno, and the Timavo sculpin. Endemic birds include the Italian sparrow. There are 288 endemic species of lepidopterans in Italy. A notable species is the European owl moth found only in Southern Italy.

== Vertebrates ==
=== Mammals ===
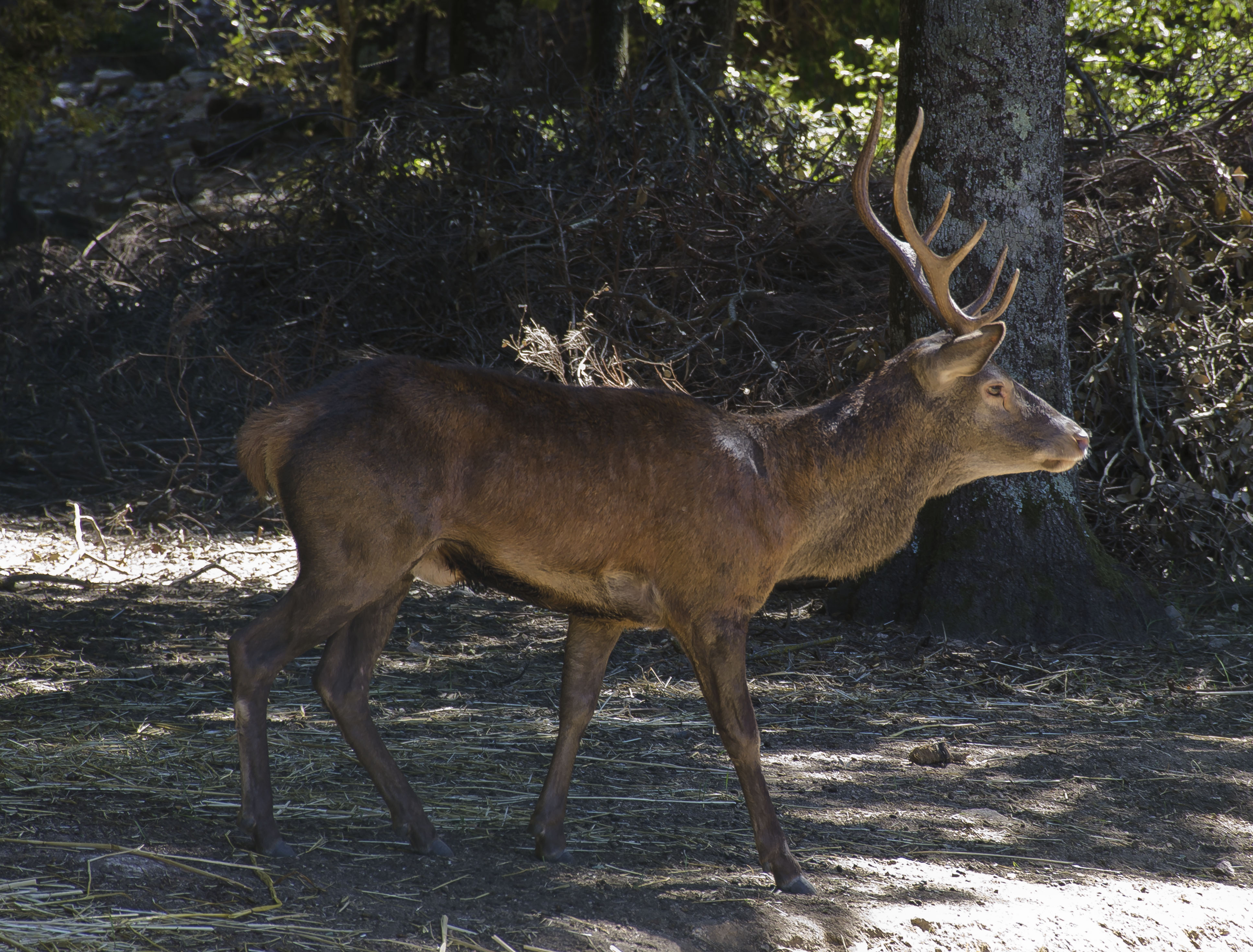
Sardinian deer

There are 119 species of mammals in Italy. Some of the species are Alpine marmot, forest dormouse, Etruscan shrew (the smallest mammal in the world), European snow vole, and Schreiber's long-fingered bat. Notable large mammals are the Eurasian lynx, Italian wolf, Marsican brown bear, Pyrenean chamois, Alpine ibex, common genet, fallow deer, mouflon, rough-toothed dolphin, crested porcupine, and Mediterranean monk seal.

=== Birds ===
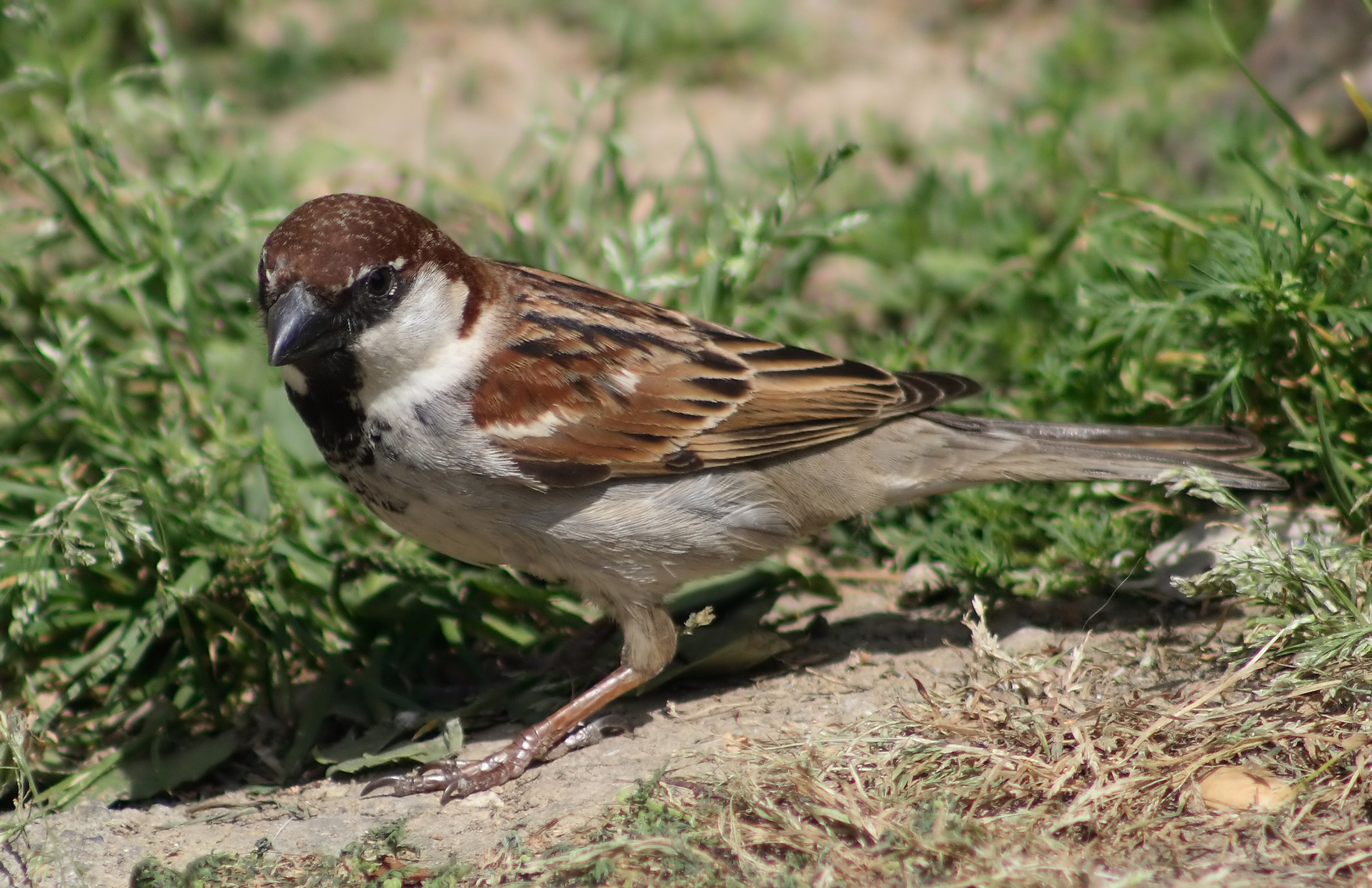
Italian sparrow, the national bird of Italy.

Italy has recorded 550 bird species. Notable birds are the hoopoe, roller, white-backed woodpecker, black woodpecker, European green woodpecker, Alpine chough, snow finch, rock partridge, Bonelli's eagle, goshawk, eagle owl, lammergeier, Egyptian vulture, griffon vulture, collared pratincole, glossy ibis, spoonbill, Allen's gallinule, great bustard, trumpeter finch, rosy starling, great spotted cuckoo, woodchat shrike, bluethroat, and Eurasian nightjar.

Italy is an important route for trans-Saharan bird migrants because it is a natural bridge connecting continental Europe to Africa across the Mediterranean. Migratory birds with a low wing loading, such as stork, European honey buzzard, black kite, marsh harrier, kestrel, and hobby, depend on thermals and updrafts for soaring to cross the Mediterranean in spring. Although the majority of these birds enter Europe via the Bosphorus or Straits of Gibraltar, large numbers leave at Cap Bon in Tunisia and enter Europe via the Aeolian Islands and the Straits of Messina to Calabria. Most of these birds breed in central and northern Europe. The birds return to Africa in autumn by the same route.

=== Reptiles ===
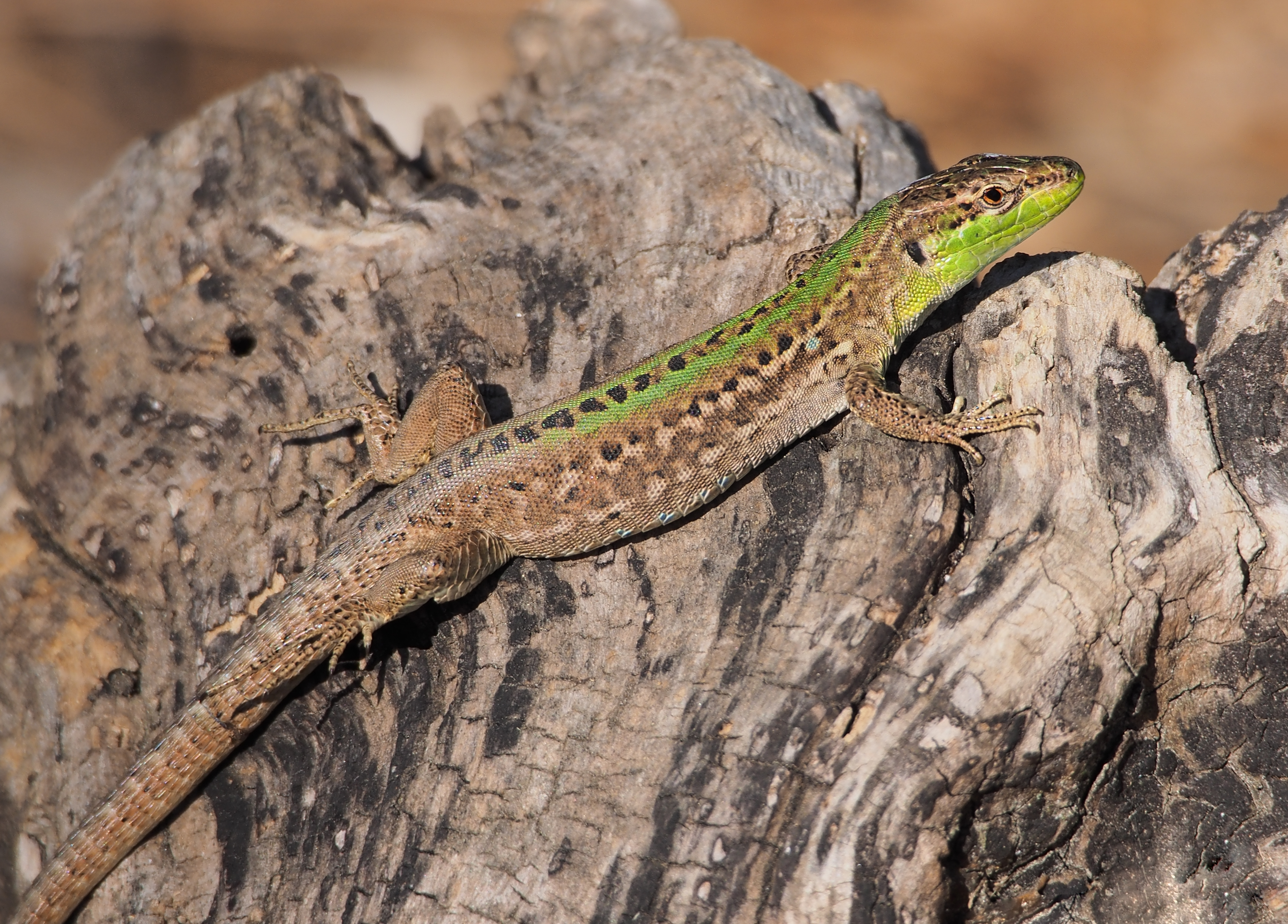
Italian wall lizard

About 69 species of reptiles have been recorded in Italy. Notable reptiles are the Dice snake, the Green whip snake, the Aesculapian snake, the Smooth snake, the Montpellier snake, the European cat snake, the Walser viper, the Meadow viper, the Horned viper, the Common European adder, the Asp viper, the Hermann's tortoise, the European pond turtle, the Sicilian pond turtle, the Italian wall lizard, the European wall lizard and the European green lizard.

=== Amphibians ===
There are 39 species of amphibians in Italy (including introduced and naturalised species) in two orders, Anura and Caudata. No Caecilian is known to live in the country. Notable amphibians are the Italian tree frog, Agile frog, Italian stream frog, Italian edible frog, Common toad, Balearic green toad, Northern spectacled salamander, Spectacled salamander, Fire salamander, Smooth newt, Italian newt, Alpine newt and Italian crested newt

=== Fishes ===
Fish in Italy are diversified into 623 species. Of all the species present about one-fifth live in fresh waters and of these 9 are endemic. Notable freshwater fishes are the Brook lamprey, Lombardy lamprey, Italian bleak, Horse barbel, Eurasian carp, European chub, Scardola scardafa, Tench, Northern pike, European perch, Lavaret and River trout.

== Invertebrates ==
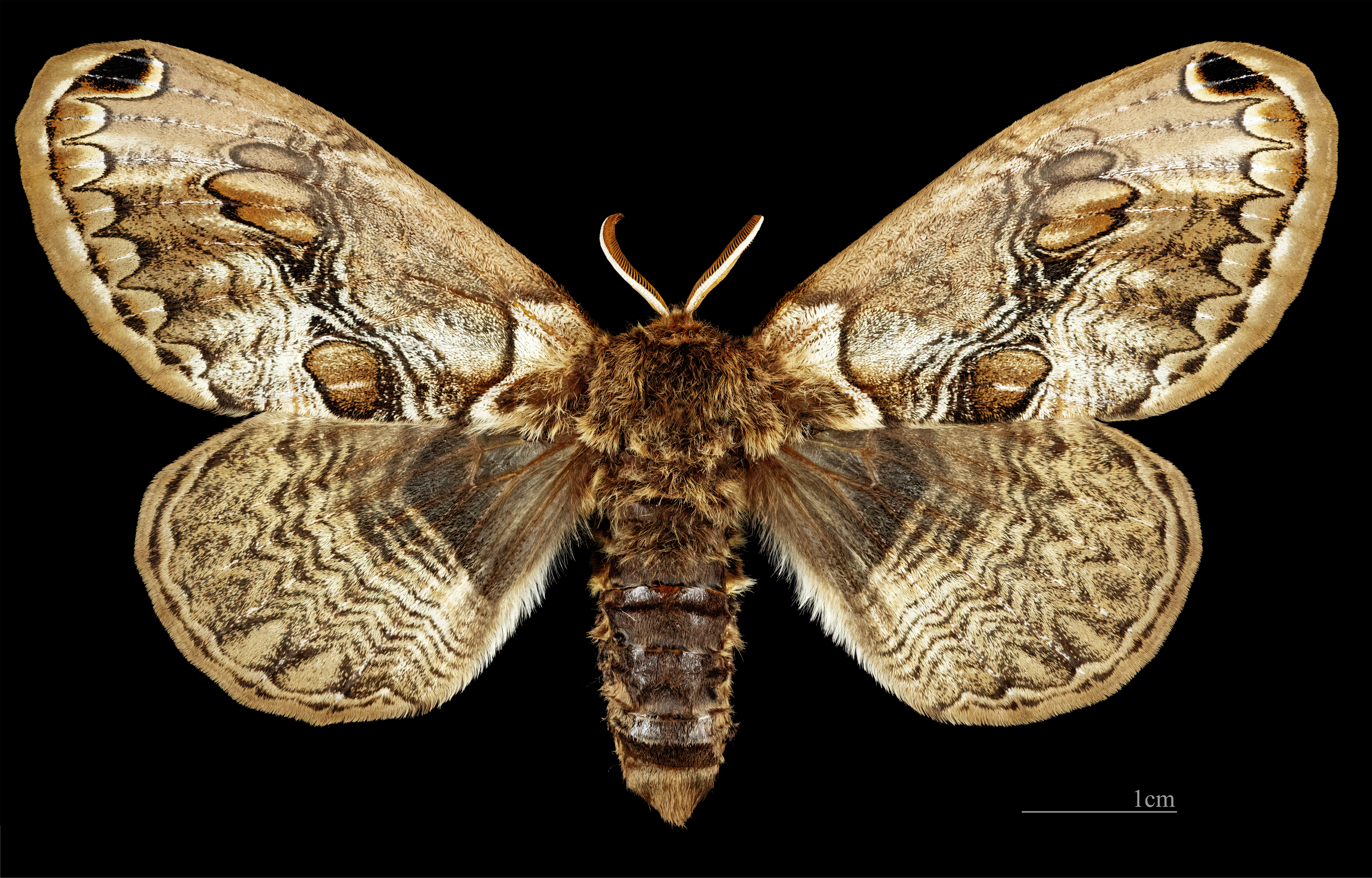
European owl moth, endemic to Southern Italy

The Italian fauna includes 56,213 species of invertebrates, of which 37,303 species of insects. Commonly seen insects in Italy are the sail swallowtail, the scarlet dragonfly, Cleopatra butterfly, European praying mantis, cicada, glow-worm, hummingbird hawk-moth, Italian stinkbug, firebug, field cricket, European hornet, cuckoo wasp, carpenter bee, and the rose chafer.

== Marine fauna ==
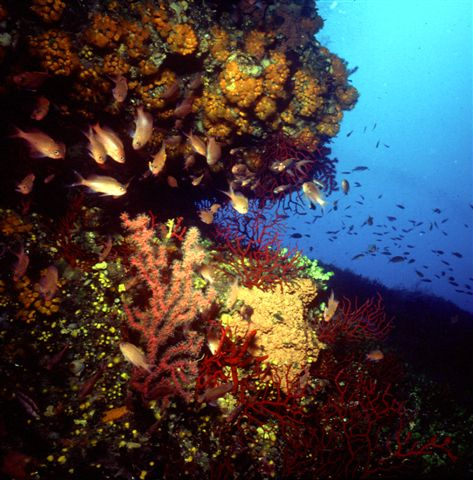
Violescent sea-whip reef in the sea near Palermo, Sicily

Characteristic habitat types of the Italian Mediterranean coastal zone are the Cystoseira biocenosis and the Posidonia oceanica seagrass beds, Lithophyllum lichenoides communities form coralligenous reefs which are a spectacular sight the coralline alga is covered with large gorgonian fans, coral, and a diverse array of often colourful invertebrate organisms and hundreds of species of fish.

These communities host sponges (Porifera), sea anemones and jellyfish (Cnidaria), sea mats and hornwrack (Bryozoa), segmented worms (Annelida), snails, bivalves, squids and octopuses (Mollusca), starfish and sea urchins (Echinodermata), crabs, lobsters and shrimps (Crustacea), and little known groups such as Echiura, Priapulida, Sipuncula, Brachiopoda, Pogonophora, Phoronida, and Hemichordata.

Amongst the thousand or so species of invertebrates found in the Italian marine environment are Squilla mantis, Mediterranean slipper lobsters, common octopus, common cuttlefish, scribbled nudibranch, Hypselodoris picta, tasselled nudibranch, Flabellina affinis, precious coral, zigzag coral, purple sail, Mediterranean jellyfish, spiny spider crab, circular crab, broad-clawed porcelain crab, noble pen shell, pilgrim’s scallop, ragged sea hare, violet sea hare, Portuguese man o' war, black sea-urchin, purple sea urchin, Mediterranean starfish, sea mouse, and Parazoanthus axinellae.

=== Strait of Messina ===
The Tyrrhenian and Ionian meet in Straits of Messina, generating powerful currents and strong turbulence, aggravated by the abrupt changes of sea bottom topography in the vicinity of the town of Messina. As a consequence, many species known as rare in the Mediterranean are found in large numbers in the straits. It is common to find deep species at the surface and vice versa, or open-sea species along the coast. The upwelling water drags abyssal species to the surface and sometimes strands them on the shore. Made famous in the nineteenth century by the zoologists Nicholas Miklouho-Maclay and Anton Dohrn, the straits have an extraordinary abundance and structure of planktonic, benthic, and nektonic communities.

== Introduced species ==
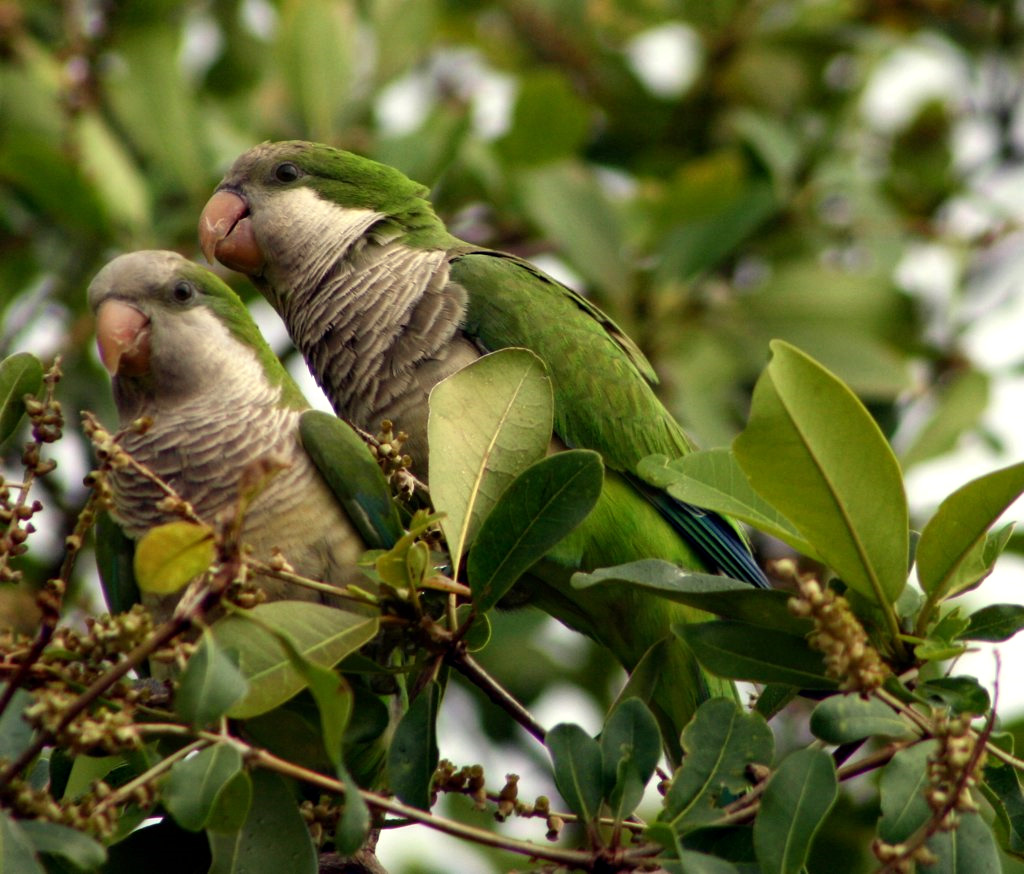
Two monk parakeets, native of South America. Self-sustaining feral populations occur in many places, mainly in North America and Europe.

The Italian fauna is rich in introduced species. Many introductions date from the time of the Roman Empire, such as the common carp.

Examples of more recent—and sometimes unwelcome—arrivals are the Asian tiger mosquito from Southeast Asia, the citrus long-horned beetle from China, the citrus pest cottony cushion scale, the pumpkinseed fish, the mosquitofish, the Louisiana crayfish, the zebra mussel, the strawberry finch, the Eastern grey squirrel, Finlayson's squirrel, and the coypu. Two introduced parrot species, the monk parakeet and the rose-ringed parakeet, are found in city parks.

=== Lessepsian migration ===
Since the construction of the Suez Canal in 1869, invasive marine species originating from the Red Sea have become a major component of the Mediterranean ecosystem. Known as the Lessepsian migration, the introduced species have caused serious impacts on the Mediterranean ecology, endangering many local and endemic Mediterranean species. About 300 species native to the Red Sea have already been identified in the Mediterranean Sea, and there are probably others yet unidentified.

== Conservation ==
National and regional parks in Italy

Italy is a signatory to the Berne Convention on the Conservation of European Wildlife and Natural Habitats and the Habitats Directive both affording protection to Italian fauna and flora. National parks cover about 5% of the country, while the total area protected by national parks, regional parks and nature reserves covers about 10.5% of the Italian territory, to which must be added 12% of coasts protected by marine protected areas.

== Pleistocene fauna ==
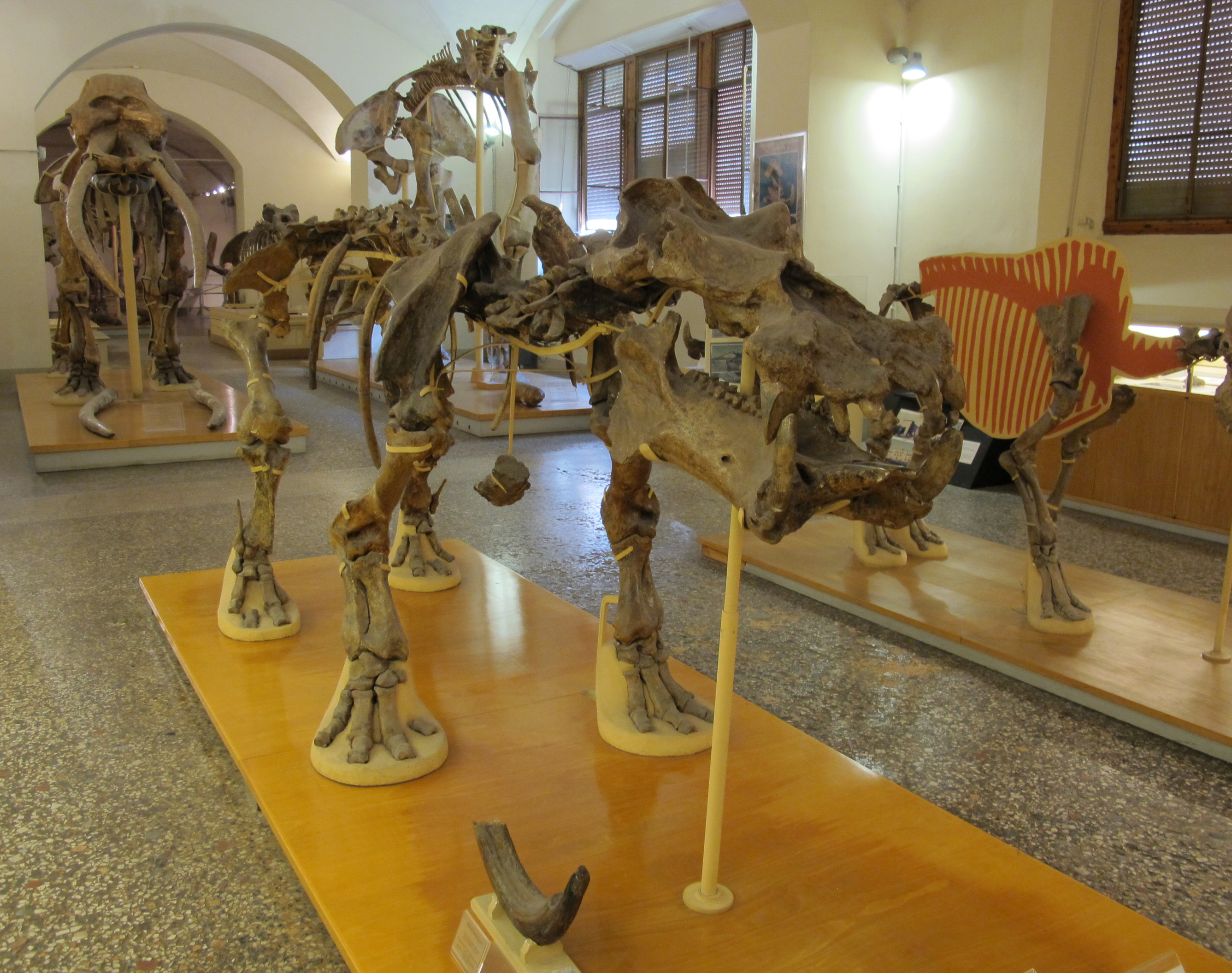
European hippopotamus skeleton in the Museo di Storia Naturale di Firenze, Florence

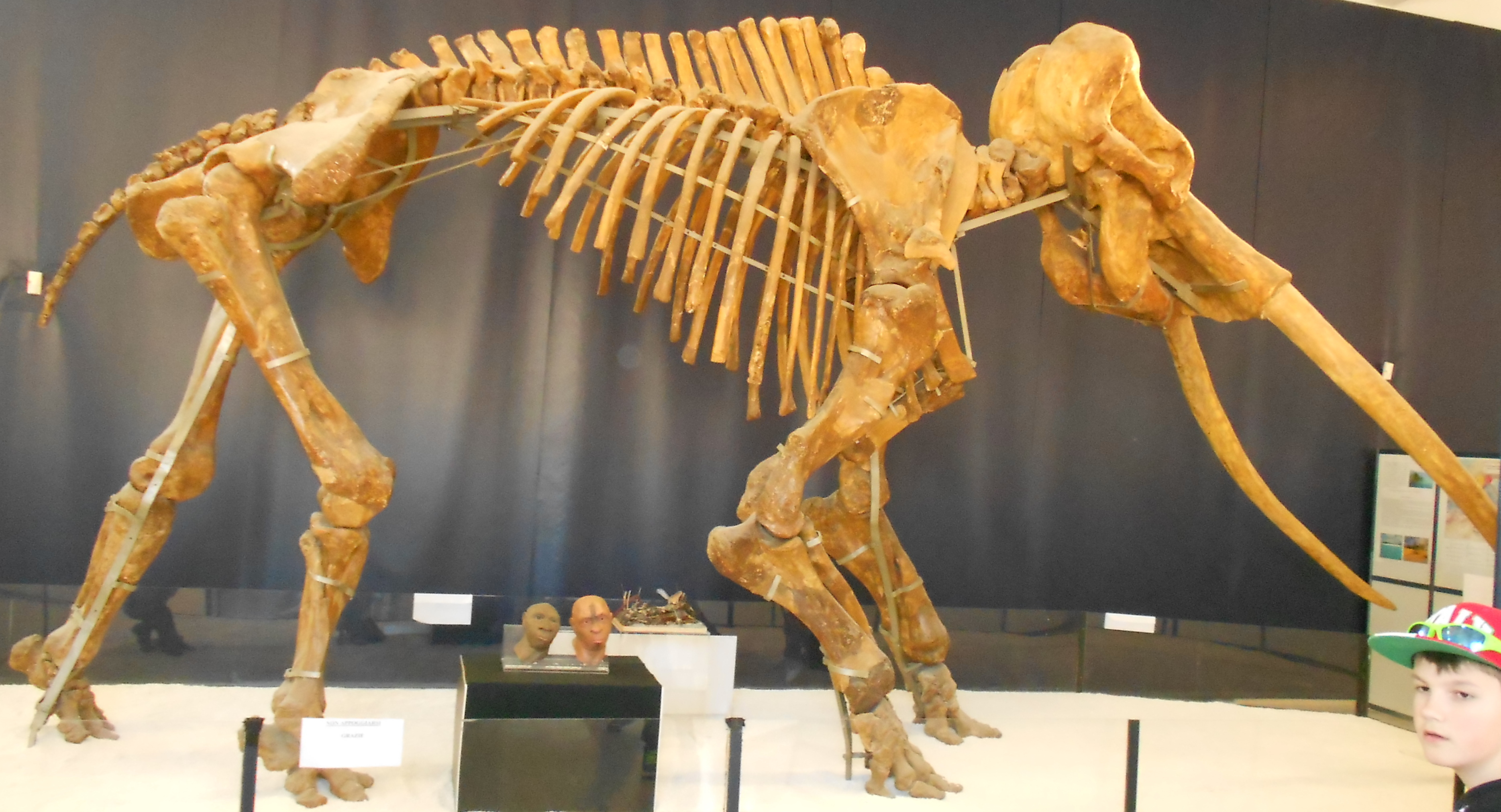
Straight-tusked elephant skeleton in the Polo museale Sapienza, Rome

The Pleistocene large mammals of Italy were primarily Eurasian immigrants fleeing extreme cold further north. Typical species are:

- Cave bear, Ursus spelaeus
- European cave lion, Panthera leo spelaea
- European hippopotamus, Hippopotamus antiquus
- Neanderthal, Homo neanderthalensis
- Woolly mammoth, Mammuthus primigenius
- Southern mammoth, Mammuthus meridionalis
- Straight-tusked elephant, Elephas (Palaeoloxodon) antiquus
- Woolly rhinoceros, Coelodonta antiquitatis

=== Insular dwarfism ===
Pleistocene dwarf elephants developed as a result of insular dwarfism on the island of Sardinia:

- Mammuthus lamarmorae (Major, 1883)
- Elephas antiquus (Acconci, 1881)
- Elephas melitensi (Caria, 1965))

On the islands of Sicily and Malta:

- Elephas (Palaeoloxodon) antiquus leonardii (Aguirre, 1969)
- Elephas (Palaeoloxodon) mnaidriensis (Adams, 1874)
- Elephas (Palaeoloxodon) melitensis (Falconer, 1868)
- Elephas (Palaeoloxodon) falconeri (Busk, 1867))

Other Pleistocene animals found on these islands are:

- Sardinian dhole, Cynotherium sardous
- Sicilian hippopotamus, Hippopotamus pentlandi
- Sardinian dwarf mammoth, Mammuthus lamarmorae

== Zoological museums ==
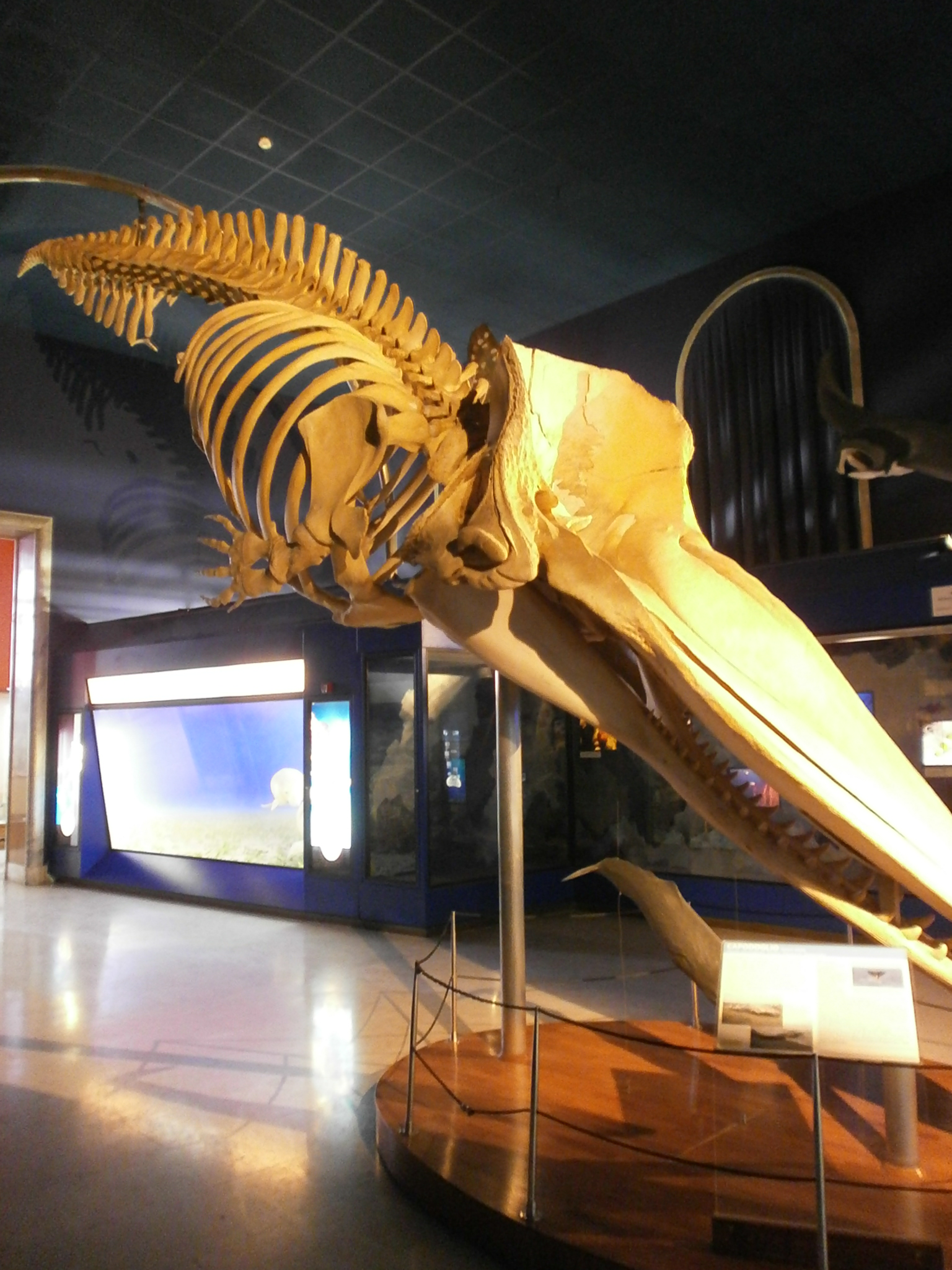
Sperm whale skeleton in the Museo Civico di Storia Naturale di Milano, Milan

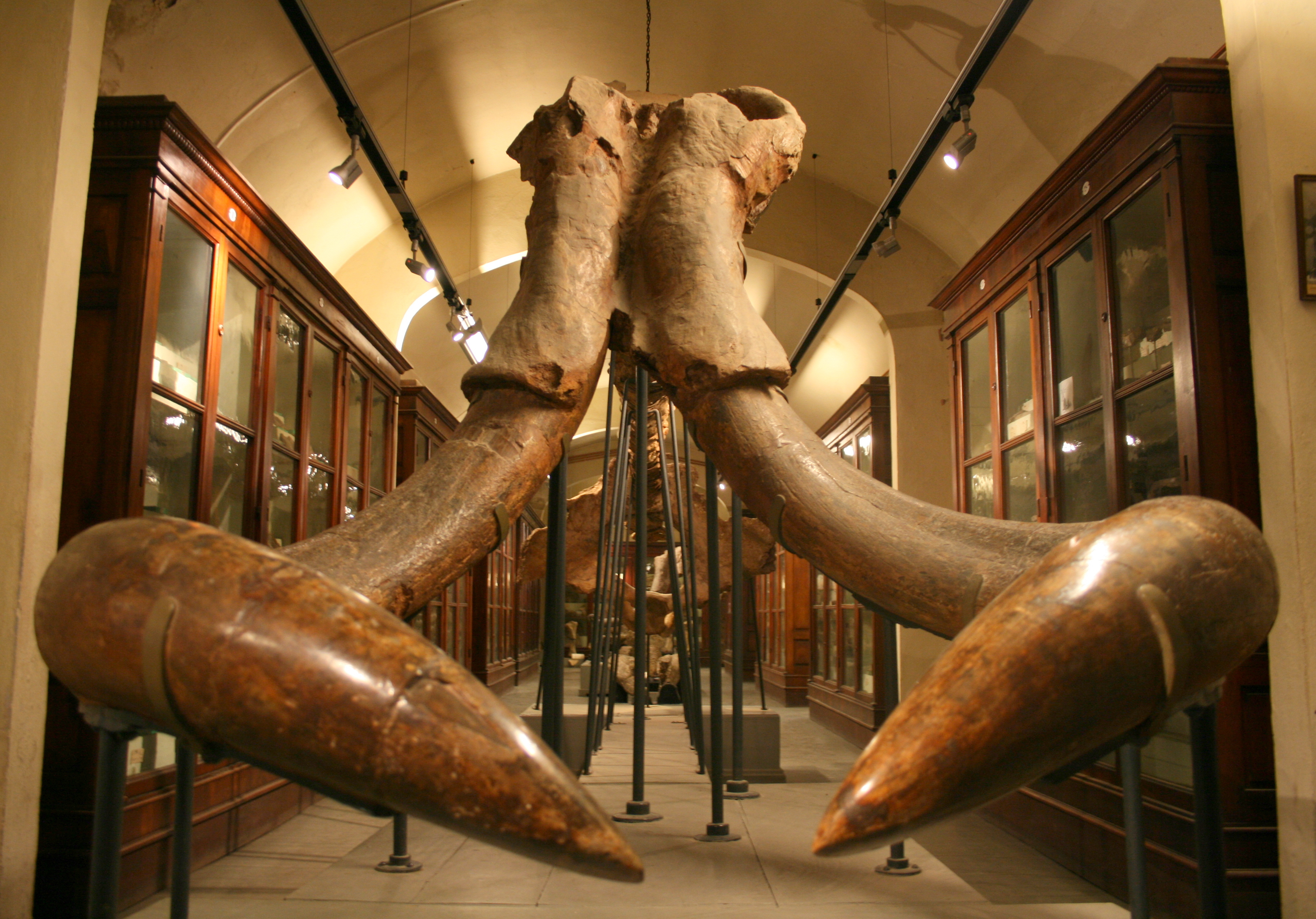
Southern mammoth skeleton in the Museo paleontologico di Montevarchi, Montevarchi

Museums which contain important collections of the fauna of Italy and which have public galleries devoted to the Italian fauna are:

- Museo Civico di Storia Naturale di Trieste, Trieste
- La Specola, the Museum of Zoology and Natural History of Florence
- Museo Civico di Storia Naturale di Ferrara
- Museo Civico di Storia Naturale di Milano, Milan
- Museo Civico di Storia Naturale Giacomo Doria, Genoa
- Museo Civico di Zoologia di Roma, Rome
- Museo civico di Rovereto, Rovereto
- Museo di Scienze Naturali Enrico Caffi, Bergamo
- Museo di Storia Naturale di Firenze, University of Florence, Florence
- Museo storia naturale di Pisa, Pisa
- Museo tridentino di scienze naturali, Trento
- Turin Museum of Natural History, Turin
- Zoological Museum of Naples, Naples
- Stazione Zoologica, Naples
- Museo paleontologico di Montevarchi, Montevarchi
- Museo civico di storia naturale di Verona, Verona.
- Museo di storia naturale del Mediterraneo, Livorno
- Museo di storia naturale della Maremma, Grosseto

== Zoological societies ==
- Ente nazionale per la protezione degli animali (ENPA)
- Lega Italiana Protezione Uccelli (LIPU)
- Unione Zoologica Italiana
- La Società Entomologica Italiana
- Societas Herpetologica Italica
- Italian Horse Protection Association
- Tethys Research Institute

== See also ==
- Flora of Italy
- Geography of Italy
- List of extinct and endangered species of Italy
- List of amphibians of Italy
- List of birds of Italy
- List of butterflies of Italy
- List of mammals of Italy
- List of moths of Italy
- List of non-marine molluscs of Italy
- List of reptiles of Italy
- List of snakes of Italy

== Bibliography ==
- Dobson, M. (1998). "Mammal distributions in the western Mediterranean: the role of human intervention". Mammal Review. 28 (2): 77–88. doi:10.1046/j.1365-2907.1998.00027.x.
- Latella L., 2007. I Musei di Storia Naturale e la gestione del territorio, l’esempio della CKmap e il Museo di Verona. Museologia scientifica (n.s.) 1: 149-151.
- Latella L., 2011. Il ruolo dei Musei di Storia Naturale nello Studio, monitoraggio, conservazione e divulgazione della biodiversità. alcuni esempi italiani. In: Pignatti S. (ed.). Aree protette e ricerca scientifica. ETS edizioni, Pisa: 101-112.
- Minelli A., Ruffo S., La Posta S. (Eds), 1993-1995Checklist delle specie della Fauna d'Italia [Checklist of the species of the Italian Fauna] Calderini Ed., Bologna. The first complete inventory of the animal species of a whole country in Europe.Records 57,422 species (56,168 invertebrates and 1,254 vertebrates). A collaboration between the Nature Conservation Service and the Scientific Committee for the Fauna of Italy, the Italian Zoological Union and the National Academy of Entomology. 272 specialists from 15 countries were involved in the project. Species are (uniquely) identified by numerical codes. The work is divided into 110 issues.
- Minelli A., 1996 La checklist delle specie della fauna italiana. Un bilancio del progetto. Bollettino Museo Civico Storia naturale Verona, 20: 249-261.
- Minelli A, Chemin, C., R. Winch & Ruffo S. Ruffo & S.2002 La fauna in Italia. The fauna in Italy. Touring Editore, Milano e Ministero dell'Ambiente e della Tutela del Territorio, Roma. Touring Editore, Milan and Ministry for the Environment and Territory, Rome. 448 pp.
- Sindaco, R., Doria, G., Razzetti, E. and Bernini, F. 2006 (eds) Atlas of Italian Amphibians and Reptiles\Atlante Degli Anfibi E Dei Rettili D'Italia Polistampa.
- Logozzo, D., Bassi, E., and Cocchi, L.. 2004. Crossing the sea en route to Africa: autumn migration of some Accipitriformes over two central Mediterranean Islands. Ring 26:71-78.
- Stoche, F., 2000 How many endemic species? Species richness assessment and conservation priorities in Italy.Belgian Journal of Entomology, 2: 125-133.
- Stoche, F., 2004 Banche dati e distribuzione della fauna italiana: gli invertebrati. Quad. Cons. Natura, 18, Min. Ambiente Ist. Naz. Fauna Selvatica: 21-36.
