= List of mammals of Italy =

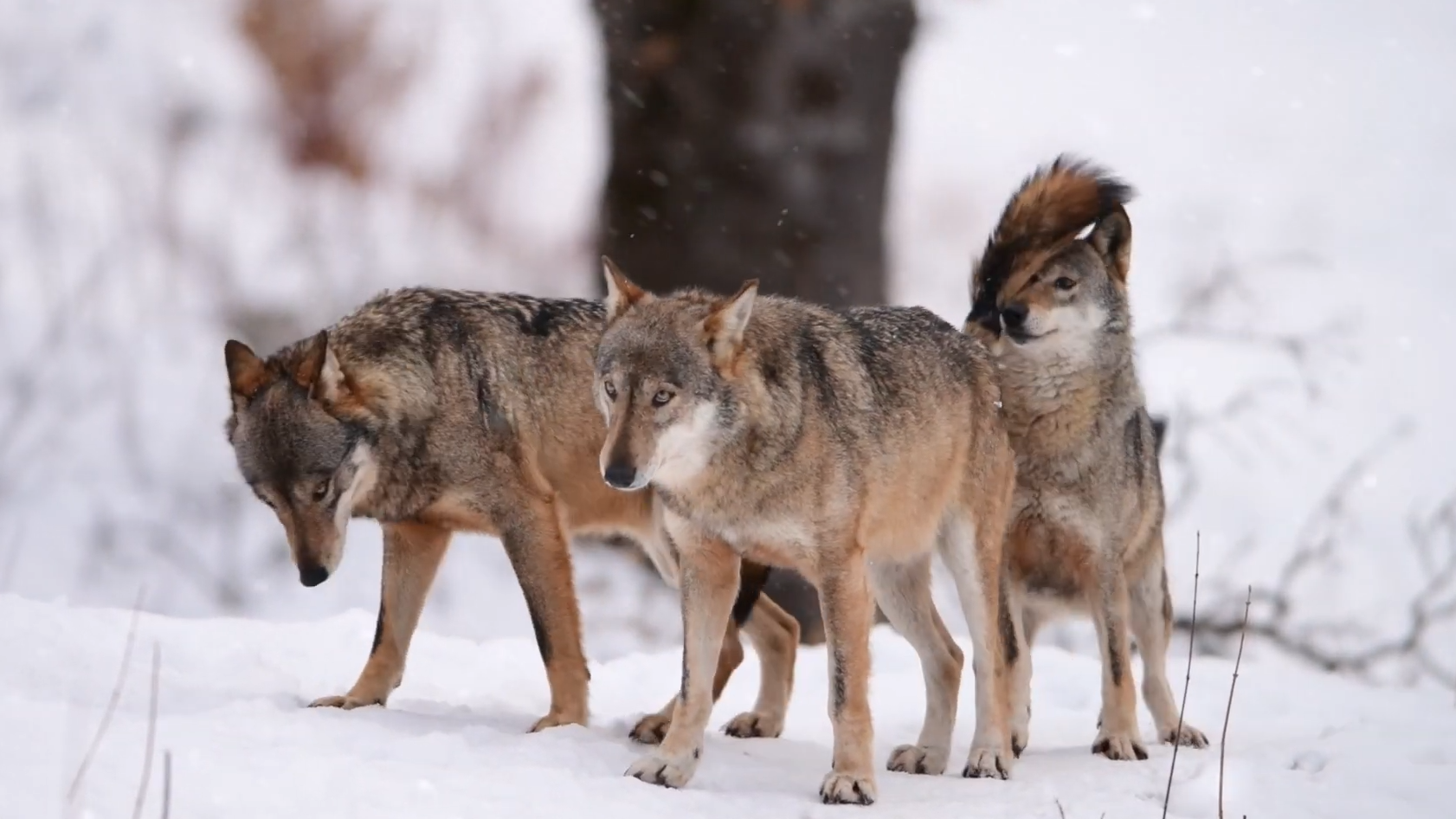
Italian wolf pack in the Abruzzo, Lazio and Molise National Park. It features prominently in Latin and Italian cultures, such as the She-Wolf in the legendary founding of Rome. For this reason it is unofficially considered the national animal of Italy.

There are 122 mammal species in Italy, of which one is critically endangered, ten are vulnerable, and thirteen are near threatened, plus ten invasive (not all listed here). One species listed for Italy is considered to be totally extinct, and another to be locally so.

Icons which state each species' global IUCN status:
EX	Extinct	No reasonable doubt that the last individual has died
CR	Critically Endangered	In imminent risk of extinction in the wild
EN	Endangered	Facing an extremely high risk of extinction in the wild
VU	Vulnerable	Facing a high risk of extinction in the wild
NT	Near Threatened	Doesn't meet any criteria that would categorise it as risking extinction but likely to in the future
LC	Least Concern	No current identifiable risks to this species
DD	Data Deficient	Inadequate information to make an assessment of the risks to this species

== Order: Rodentia (rodents) ==
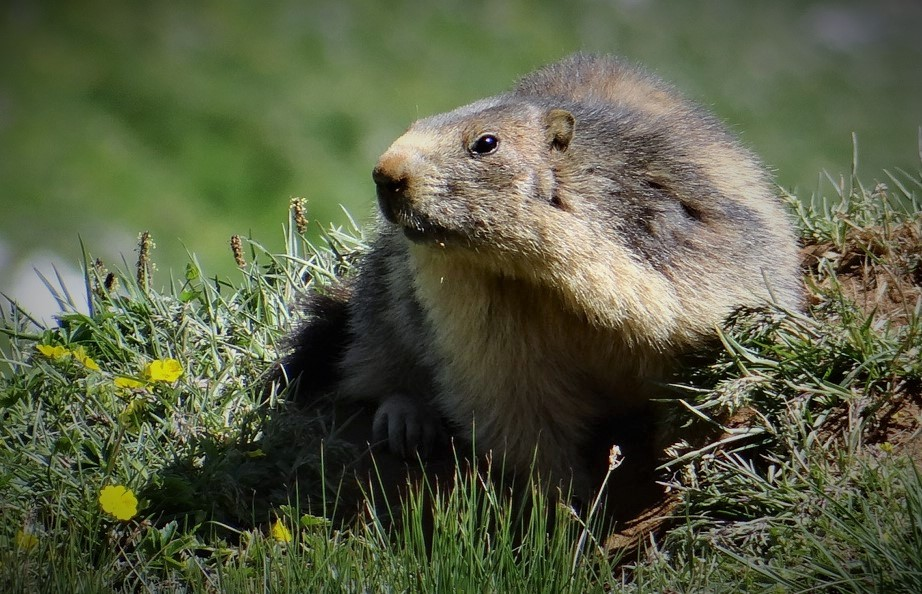
Alpine marmot

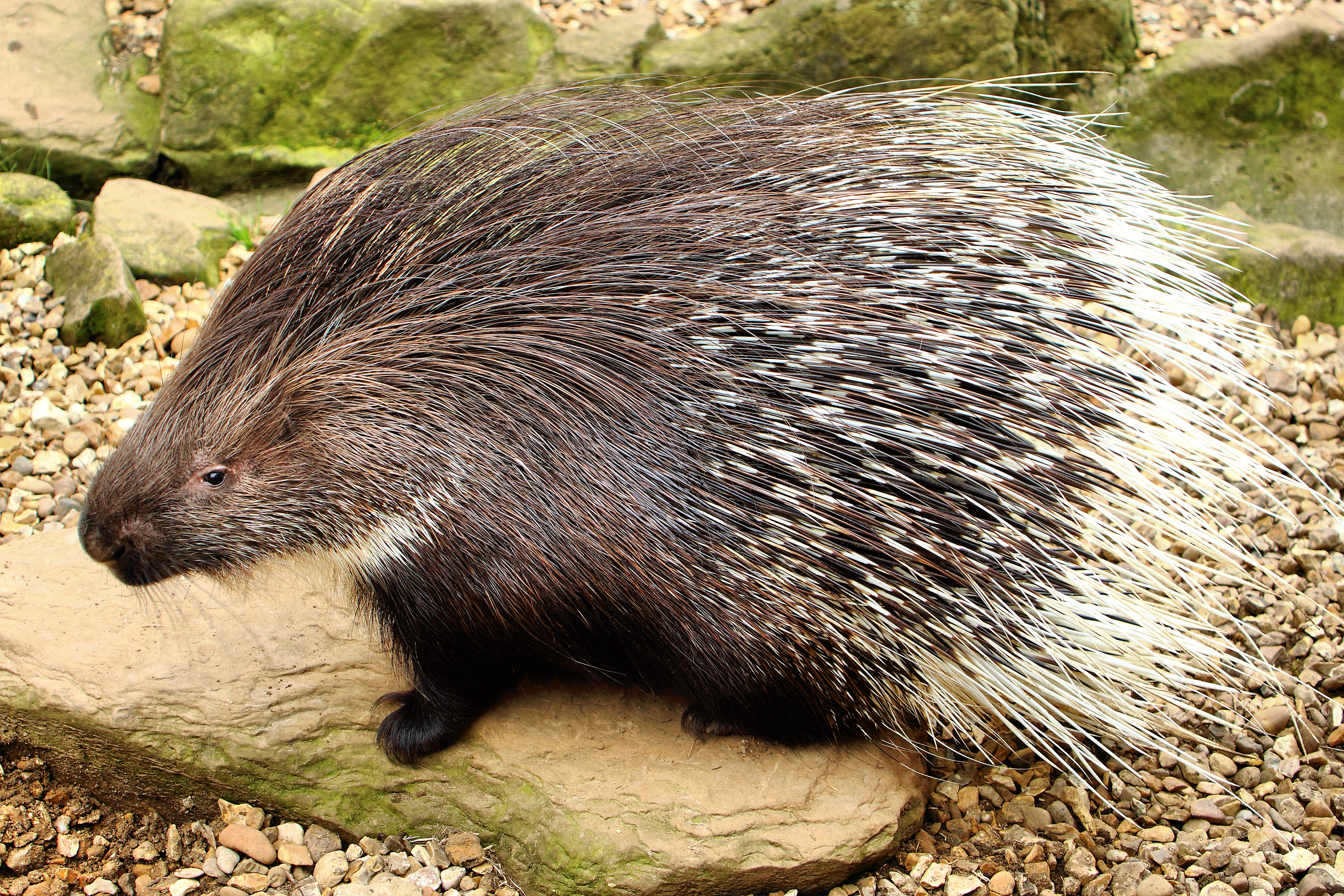
Crested porcupine

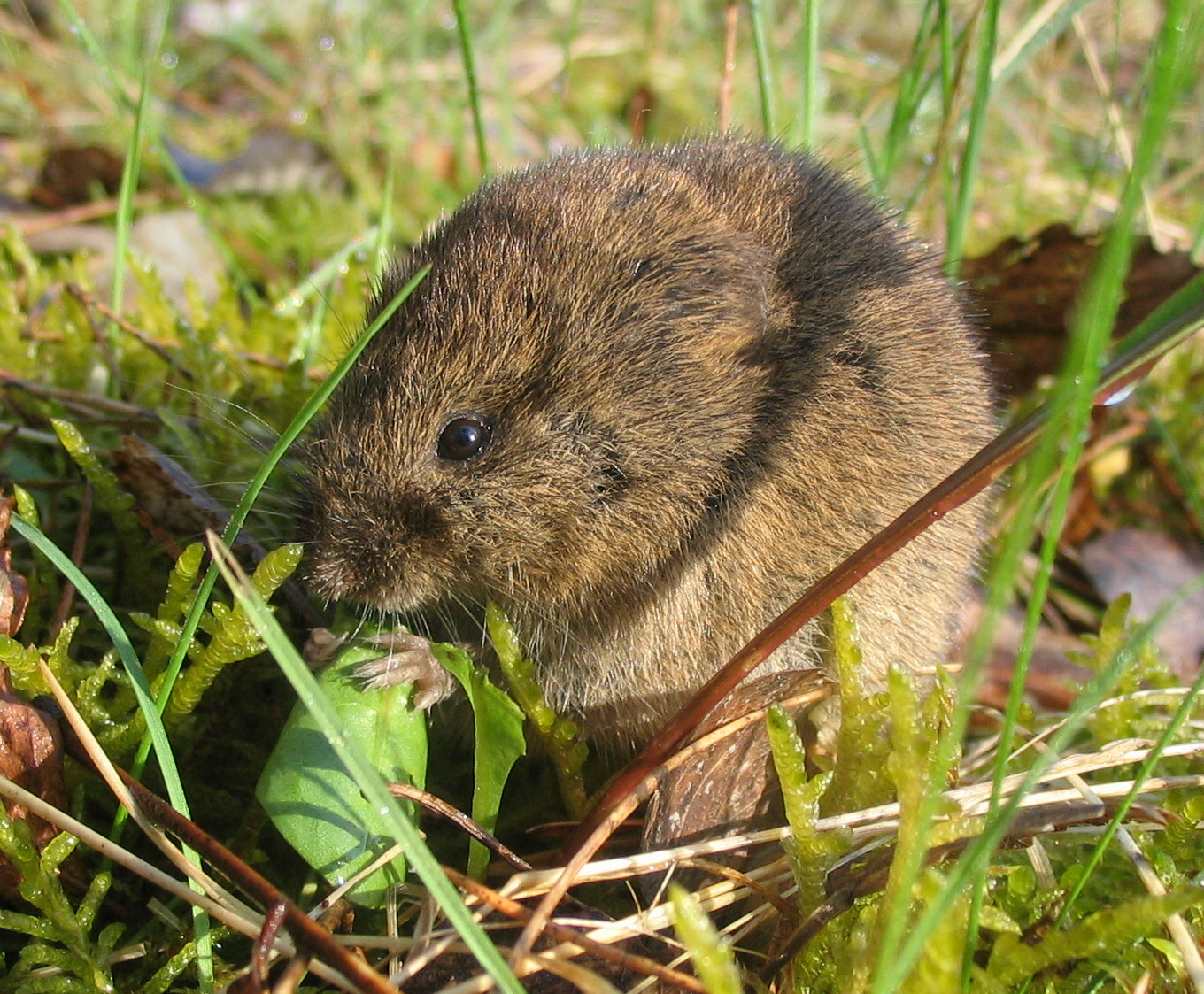
Common vole

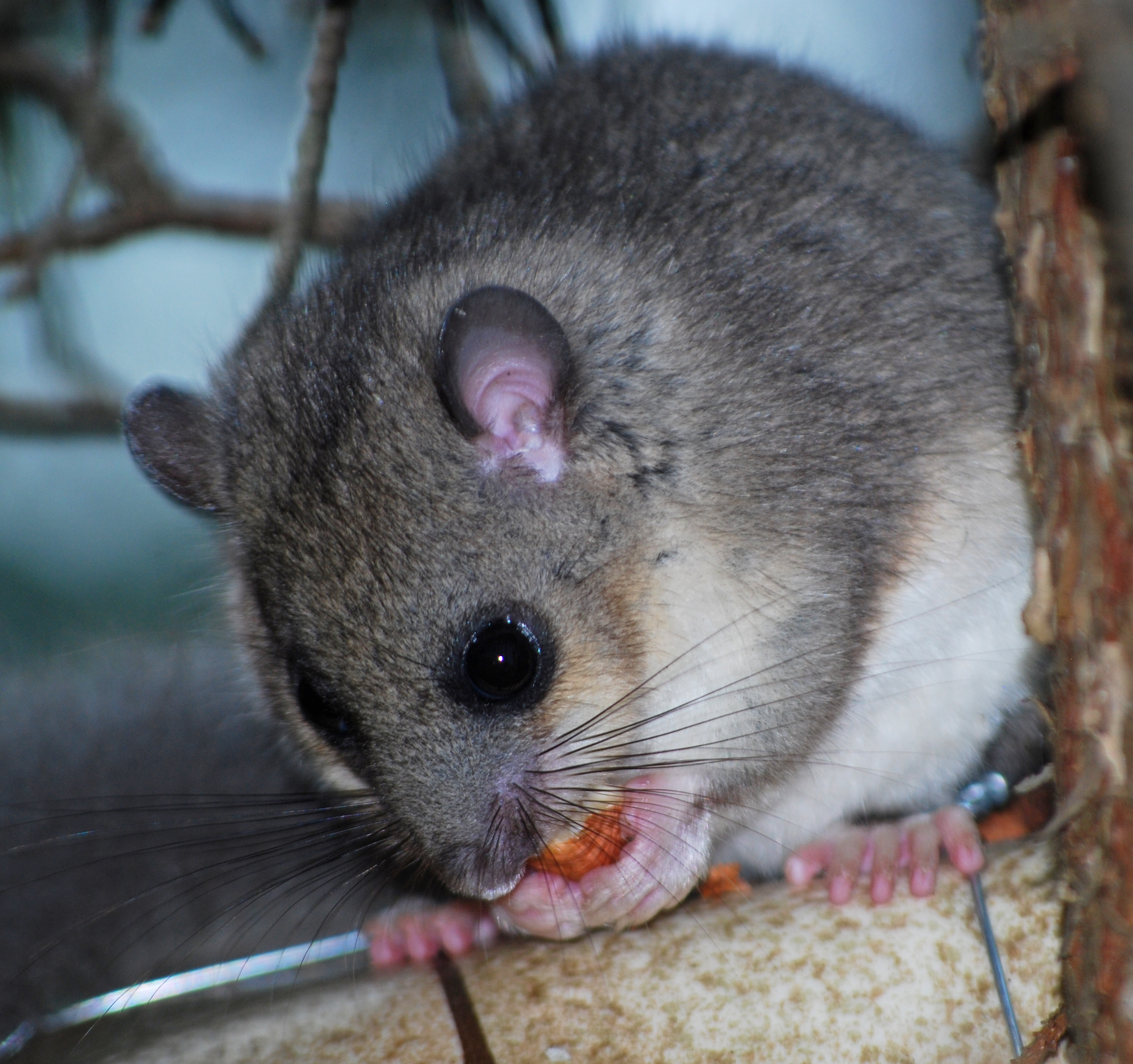
European edible dormouse

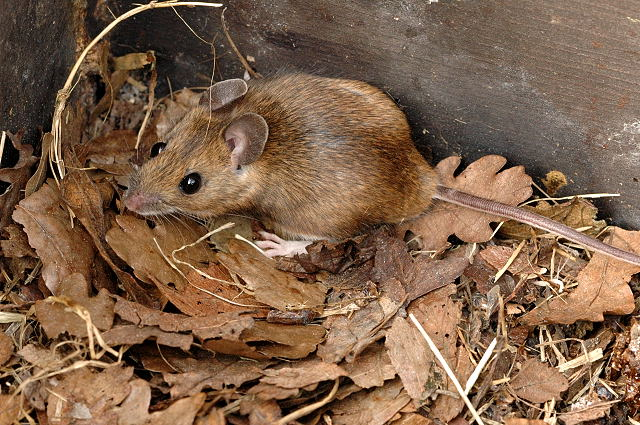
Yellow-necked mouse

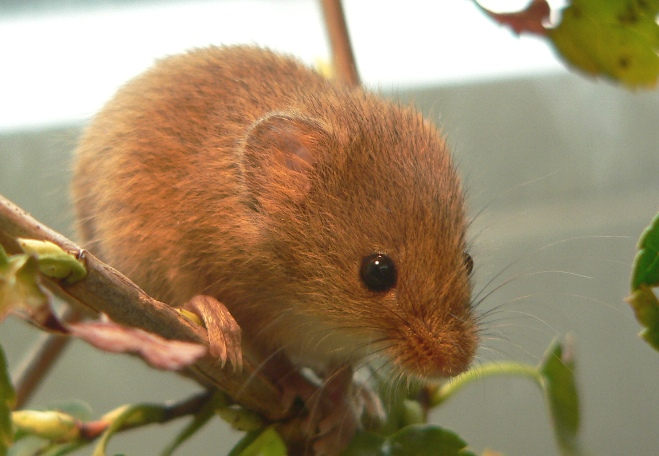
Eurasian harvest mouse

Rodents make up the largest order of mammals, with over 40% of mammalian species. They have two incisors in the upper and lower jaw which grow continually and must be kept short by gnawing.

- Suborder: Hystricognathi
  - Family: Hystricidae (Old World porcupines)
    - Genus: Hystrix
      - Crested porcupine, H. cristata LC
- Suborder: Castorimorpha
  - Family: Castoridae (beavers)
    - Genus: Castor
      - Eurasian beaver, C. fiber LC
- Suborder: Sciurognathi
  - Family: Sciuridae (squirrels)
    - Subfamily: Sciurinae
      - Tribe: Sciurini
        - Genus: Sciurus
          - Calabrian black squirrel, S. meridionalis NT
          - Red squirrel, S. vulgaris LC
    - Subfamily: Xerinae
      - Tribe: Marmotini
        - Genus: Marmota
          - Alpine marmot, M. marmota LC
  - Family: Gliridae (dormice)
    - Subfamily: Leithiinae
      - Genus: Dryomys
        - Forest dormouse, D. nitedula LC
      - Genus: Eliomys
        - Garden dormouse, E. quercinus NT
      - Genus: Muscardinus
        - Hazel dormouse, M. avellanarius LC
    - Subfamily: Glirinae
      - Genus: Glis
        - European edible dormouse, Glis glis LC
  - Family: Cricetidae
    - Subfamily: Arvicolinae
      - Genus: Arvicola
        - European water vole, A. amphibius LC
      - Genus: Chionomys
        - European snow vole, Chionomys nivalis LC
      - Genus: Clethrionomys
        - Bank vole, Clethrionomys glareolus LC
      - Genus: Microtus
        - Field vole, Microtus agrestis LC
        - Common vole, Microtus arvalis LC
        - Calabria pine vole, Microtus brachycercus LC
        - Alpine pine vole, Microtus multiplex LC
        - Savi's pine vole, Microtus savii LC
        - European pine vole, Microtus subterraneus LC
  - Family: Muridae (mice, rats, voles, gerbils, hamsters, etc.)
    - Subfamily: Murinae
      - Genus: Mus
        - House mouse, M. musculus LC
      - Genus: Apodemus
        - Alpine field mouse, Apodemus alpicola LC
        - Yellow-necked mouse, Apodemus flavicollis LC
        - Wood mouse, Apodemus sylvaticus LC
      - Genus: Micromys
        - Eurasian harvest mouse, Micromys minutus LC
      - Genus: Rattus
        - Brown rat, R. norvegicus LC, introduced in the Early Modern Ages
        - Black rat, R. rattus LC, introduced in the Middle Ages

== Order: Lagomorpha (lagomorphs) ==
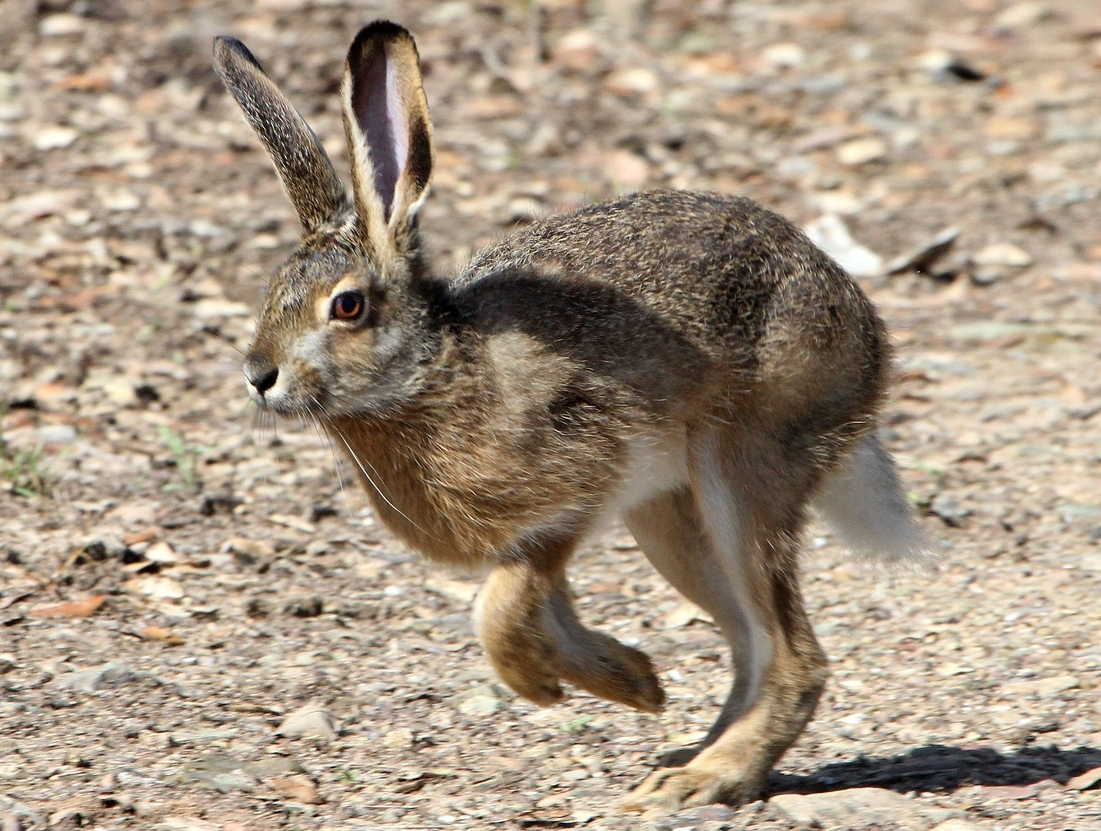
Corsican hare

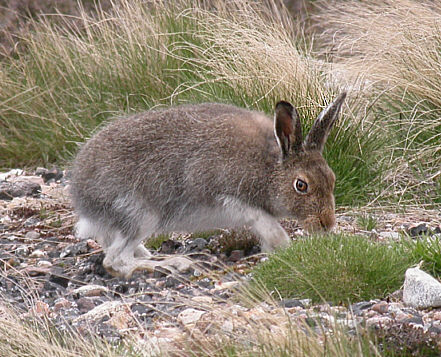
Mountain hare

The lagomorphs comprise two families, Leporidae (hares and rabbits), and Ochotonidae (pikas). Though they can resemble rodents, and were classified as a superfamily in that order until the early 20th century, they have since been considered a separate order. They differ from rodents in a number of physical characteristics, such as having four incisors in the upper jaw rather than two.

- Family: Leporidae (rabbits, hares)
  - Genus: Lepus
    - Cape hare, L. capensis LC
    - Corsican hare, L. corsicanus VU
    - European hare, L. europaeus LC
    - Mountain hare, L. timidus LC
  - Genus: Oryctolagus
    - European rabbit, O. cuniculus NT
- Family: Ochotonidae (pikas)
  - Genus: Prolagus
    - Sardinian pika, P. sardus EX, extinct in Antiquity

== Order: Eulipotyphla (shrews, hedgehogs, gymnures, moles and solenodons) ==
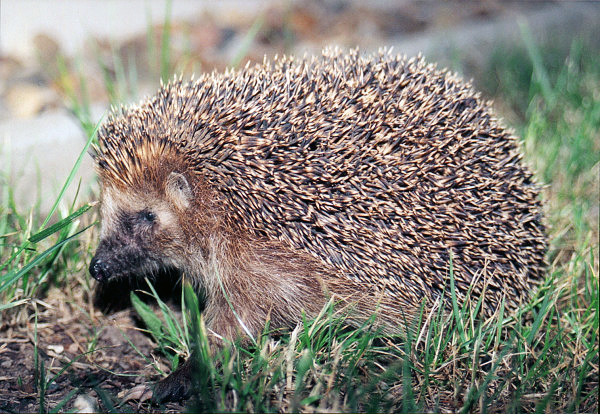
West European hedgehog

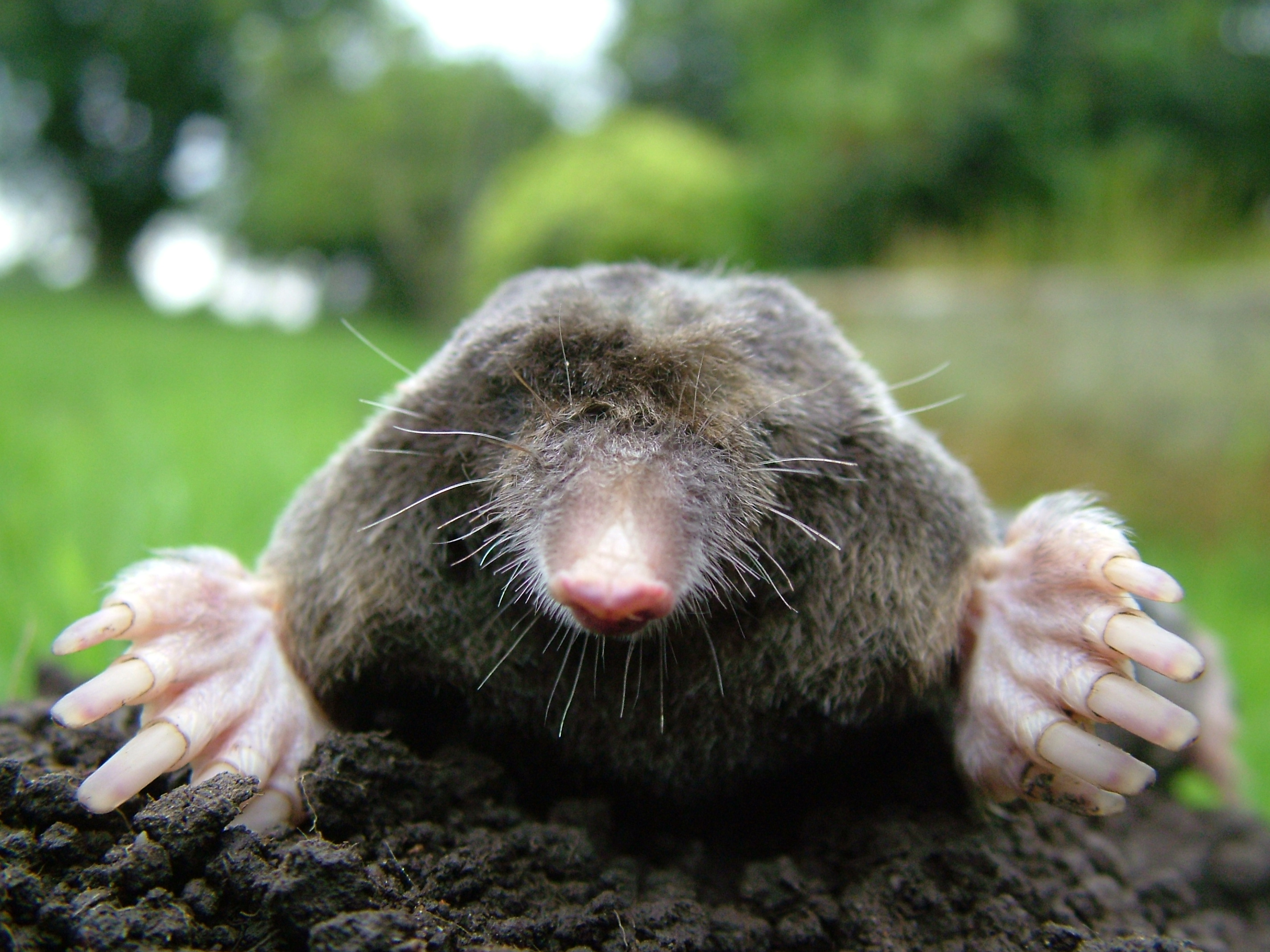
European mole

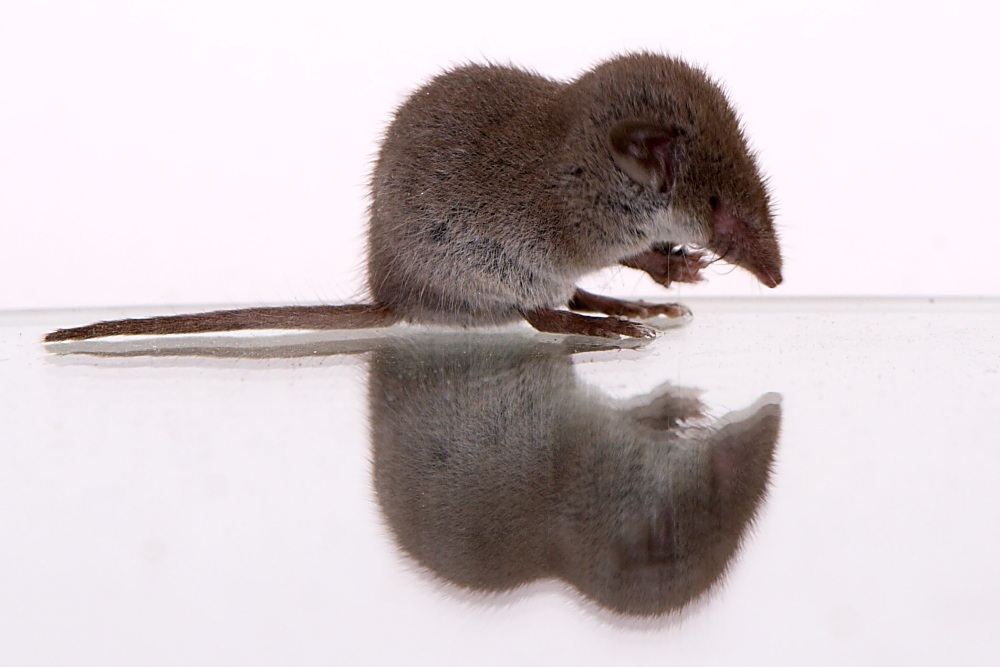
Lesser white-toothed shrew

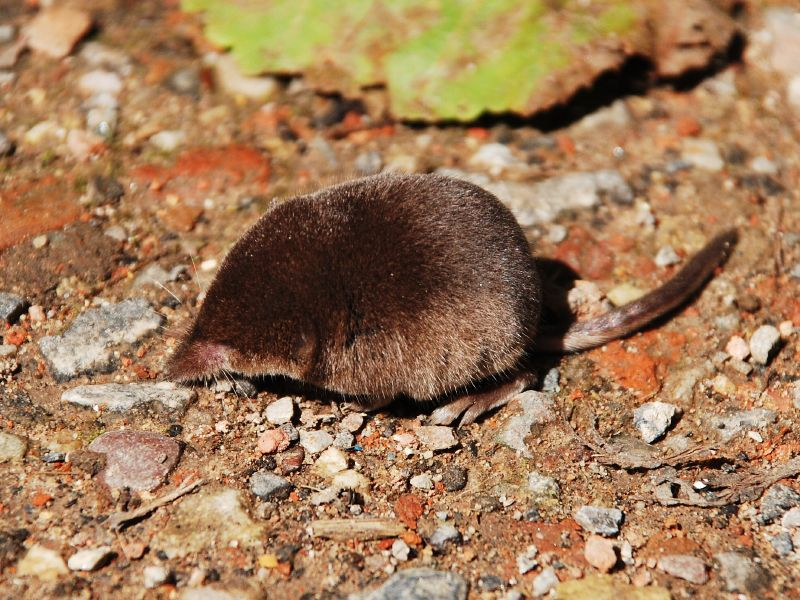
Eurasian pygmy shrew

Eulipotyphlans are insectivorous mammals. Shrews and solenodons resemble mice, hedgehogs carry spines, gymnures look more like large rats, while moles are stout-bodied burrowers.

- Family: Erinaceidae (hedgehogs and gymnures)
  - Subfamily: Erinaceinae
    - Genus: Erinaceus
      - West European hedgehog, E. europaeus NT
- Family: Soricidae (shrews)
  - Subfamily: Crocidurinae
    - Genus: Crocidura
      - North African white-toothed shrew, Crocidura cossyrensis LC
      - Bicolored shrew, Crocidura leucodon LC
      - Sicilian shrew, Crocidura sicula LC
      - Lesser white-toothed shrew, C. suaveolens LC
    - Genus: Suncus
      - Etruscan shrew, Suncus etruscus LC
  - Subfamily: Soricinae
    - Tribe: Nectogalini
      - Genus: Neomys
        - Southern water shrew, Neomys anomalus LC
        - Eurasian water shrew, Neomys fodiens LC
    - Tribe: Soricini
      - Genus: Sorex
        - Alpine shrew, Sorex alpinus NT
        - Common shrew, Sorex araneus LC
        - Eurasian pygmy shrew, Sorex minutus LC
        - Apennine shrew, Sorex samniticus LC
- Family: Talpidae (moles)
  - Subfamily: Talpinae
    - Tribe: Talpini
      - Genus: Talpa
        - European mole, Talpa europaea LC
        - Mediterranean mole, Talpa caeca LC
        - Roman mole, Talpa romana LC

== Order: Chiroptera (bats) ==
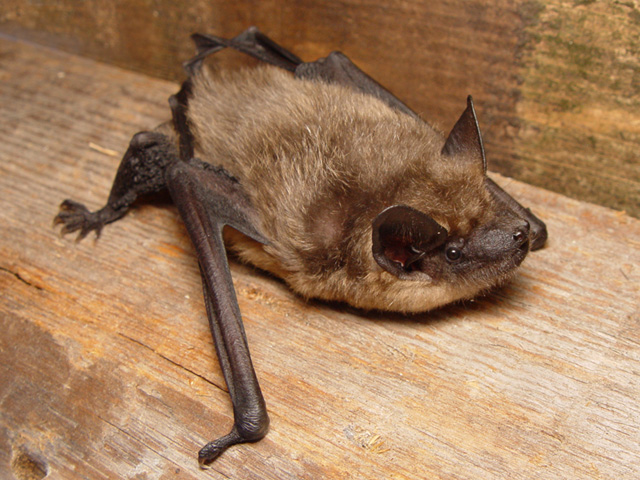
Serotine bat

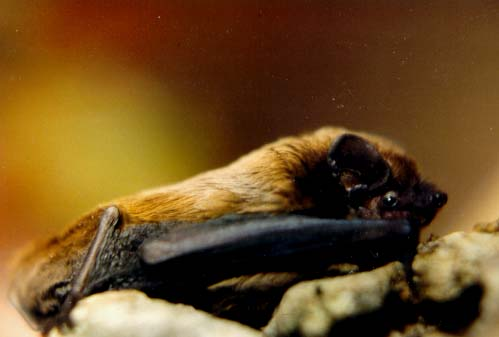
Lesser noctule

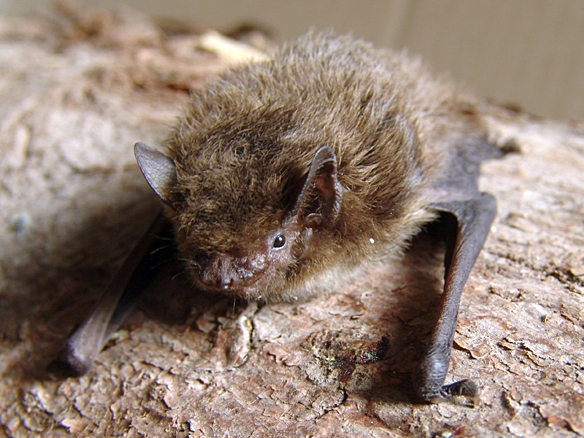
Nathusius' pipistrelle

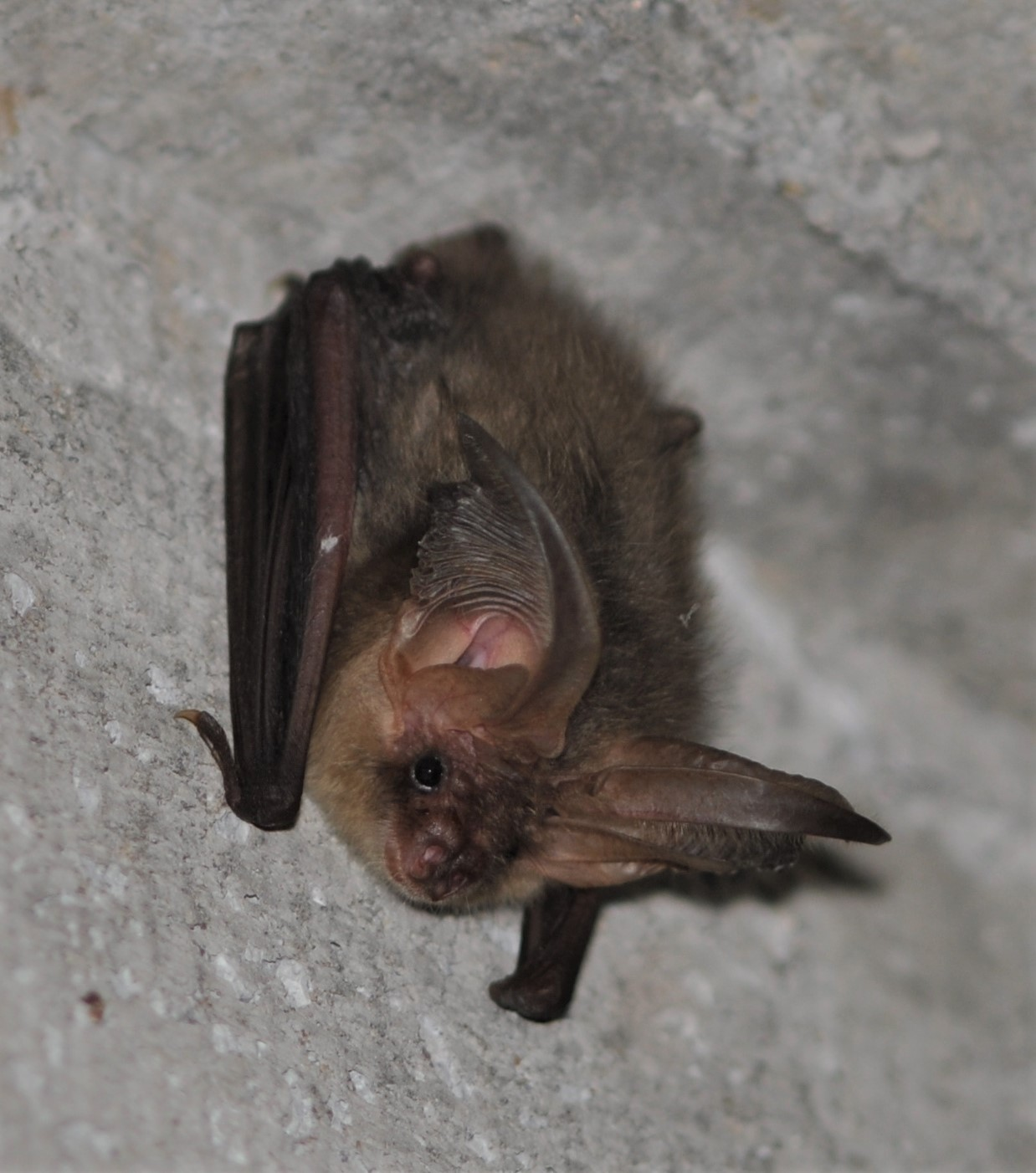
Brown long-eared bat

The bats' most distinguishing feature is that their forelimbs are developed as wings, making them the only mammals capable of flight. Bat species account for about 20% of all mammals.

- Family: Vespertilionidae
  - Subfamily: Myotinae
    - Genus: Myotis
      - Bechstein's bat, M. bechsteini NT
      - Lesser mouse-eared bat, M. blythii LC
      - Brandt's bat, M. brandti LC
      - Long-fingered bat, M. capaccinii VU
      - Cryptic myotis, M. crypticus NT
      - Daubenton's bat, M. daubentonii LC
      - Geoffroy's bat, M. emarginatus LC
      - Greater mouse-eared bat, M. myotis LC
      - Whiskered bat, M. mystacinus LC
      - Natterer's bat, M. nattereri LC
  - Subfamily: Vespertilioninae
    - Genus: Barbastella
      - Western barbastelle, B. barbastellus NT
    - Genus: Eptesicus
      - Northern bat, E. nilssoni LC
      - Serotine bat, E. serotinus LC
    - Genus: Hypsugo
      - Savi's pipistrelle, H. savii LC
    - Genus: Nyctalus
      - Greater noctule bat, N. lasiopterus VU
      - Lesser noctule, N. leisleri LC
      - Common noctule, N. noctula LC
    - Genus: Pipistrellus
      - Kuhl's pipistrelle, P. kuhlii LC
      - Nathusius' pipistrelle, P. nathusii LC
      - Common pipistrelle, P. pipistrellus LC
    - Genus: Plecotus
      - Brown long-eared bat, P. auritus LC
      - Grey long-eared bat, P. austriacus NT
    - Genus: Vespertilio
      - Parti-coloured bat, V. murinus LC
  - Subfamily: Miniopterinae
    - Genus: Miniopterus
      - Common bent-wing bat, M. schreibersii VU
- Family: Molossidae
  - Genus: Tadarida
    - European free-tailed bat, T. teniotis LC
- Family: Rhinolophidae
  - Subfamily: Rhinolophinae
    - Genus: Rhinolophus
      - Mediterranean horseshoe bat, R. euryale NT
      - Greater horseshoe bat, R. ferrumequinum LC
      - Lesser horseshoe bat, R. hipposideros LC
      - Mehely's horseshoe bat, R. mehelyi VU

== Order: Cetacea (whales) ==
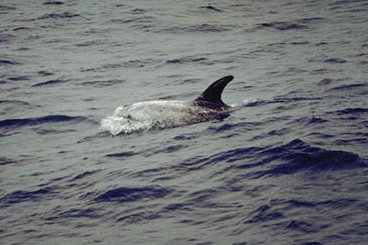
Risso's dolphin

The order Cetacea includes whales, dolphins and porpoises. They are the mammals most fully adapted to aquatic life with a spindle-shaped nearly hairless body, protected by a thick layer of blubber, and forelimbs and tail modified to provide propulsion underwater.

- Suborder: Mysticeti
  - Family: Balaenidae (right whales)
    - Genus: Eubalaena
      - North Atlantic right whale, E. glacialis CR
  - Family: Balaenopteridae (rorquals)
    - Subfamily: Megapterinae
      - Genus: Megaptera
        - Humpback whale, M. novaeangliae LC
    - Subfamily: Balaenopterinae
      - Genus: Balaenoptera
        - Fin whale, Balaenoptera physalus VU
        - Common minke whale, Balaenoptera acutorostrata LC
- Suborder: Odontoceti
  - Family: Physeteridae
    - Genus: Physeter
      - Sperm whale, Physeter macrocephalus VU
  - Superfamily: Platanistoidea
    - Family: Ziphidae
      - Genus: Ziphius
        - Cuvier's beaked whale, Ziphius cavirostris LC
      - Genus: Mesoplodon
        - Sowerby's beaked whale, Mesoplodon bidens LC
        - Gervais' beaked whale, Mesoplodon europaeus LC, vagrant
    - Family: Delphinidae (marine dolphins)
      - Genus: Steno
        - Rough-toothed dolphin, Steno bredanensis LC
      - Genus: Tursiops
        - Common bottlenose dolphin, Tursiops truncatus LC
      - Genus: Stenella
        - Striped dolphin, Stenella coeruleoalba LC
      - Genus: Delphinus
        - Short-beaked common dolphin, Delphinus delphis LC
      - Genus: Grampus
        - Risso's dolphin, Grampus griseus LC
      - Genus: Feresa
        - Pygmy killer whale, Feresa attenuata LC
      - Genus: Pseudorca
        - False killer whale, Pseudorca crassidens NT
      - Genus: Orcinus
        - Orca, O. orca DD
      - Genus: Globicephala
        - Long-finned pilot whale, G. melas LC

== Order: Carnivora (carnivorans) ==
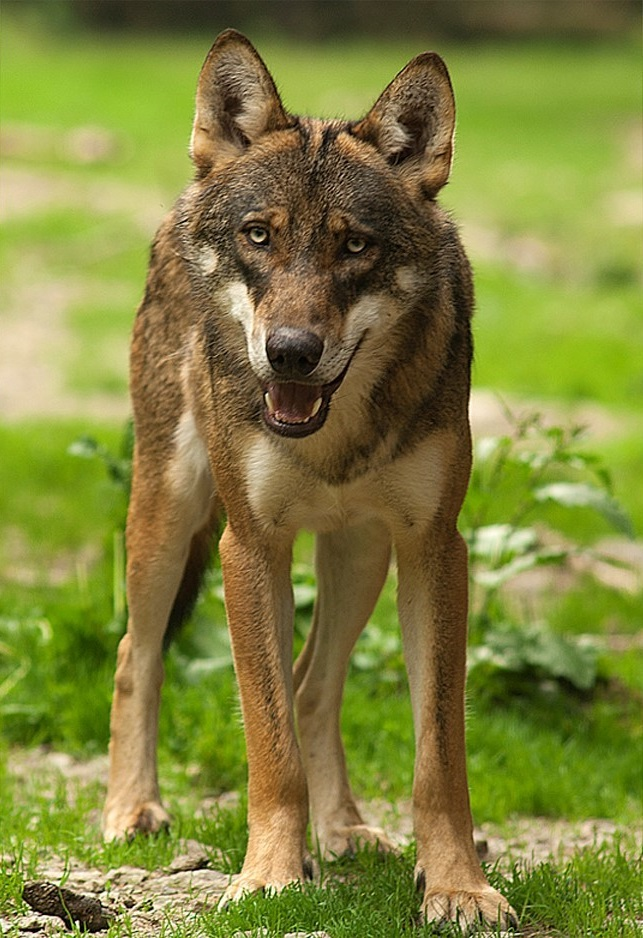
Wolf

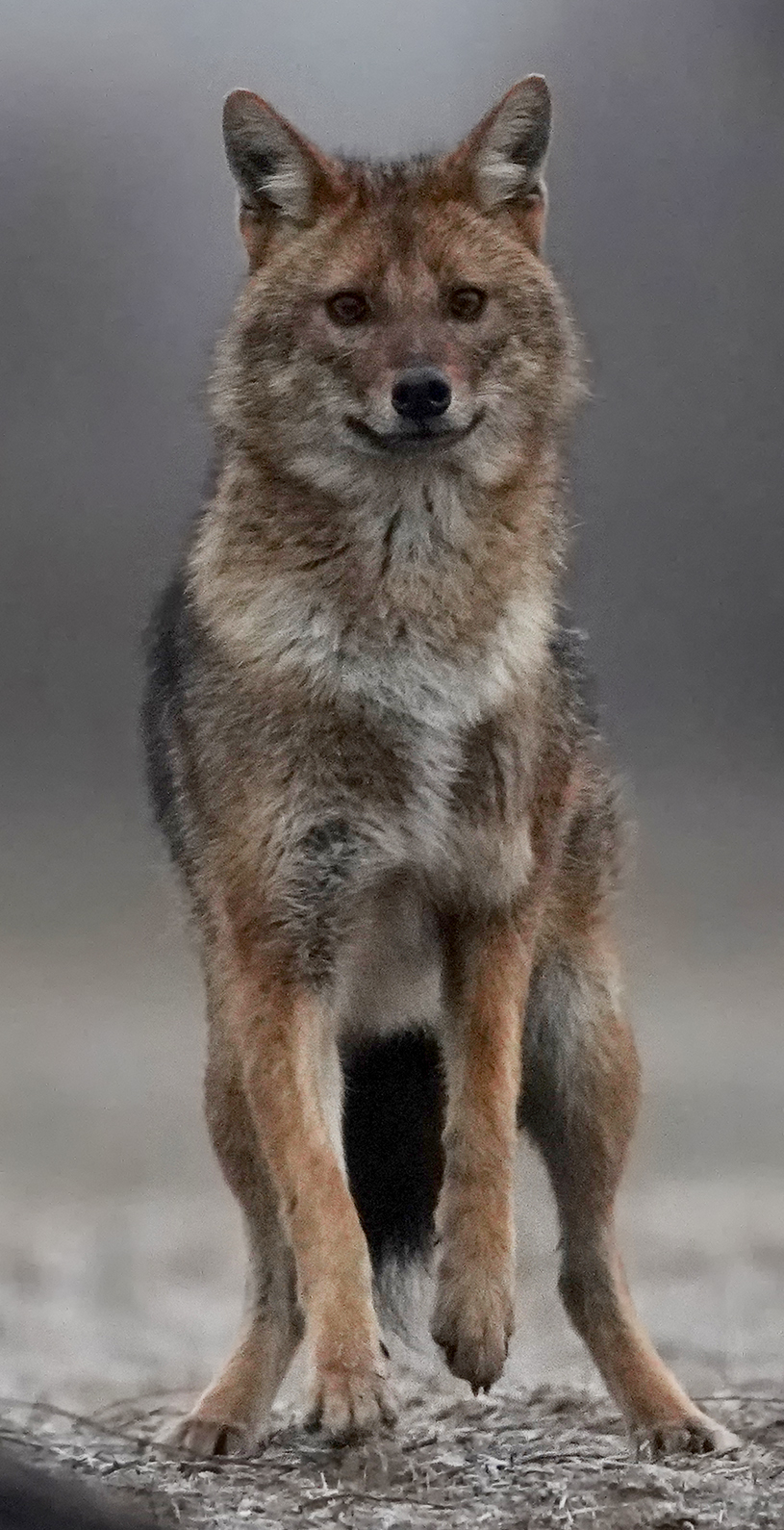
Golden jackal

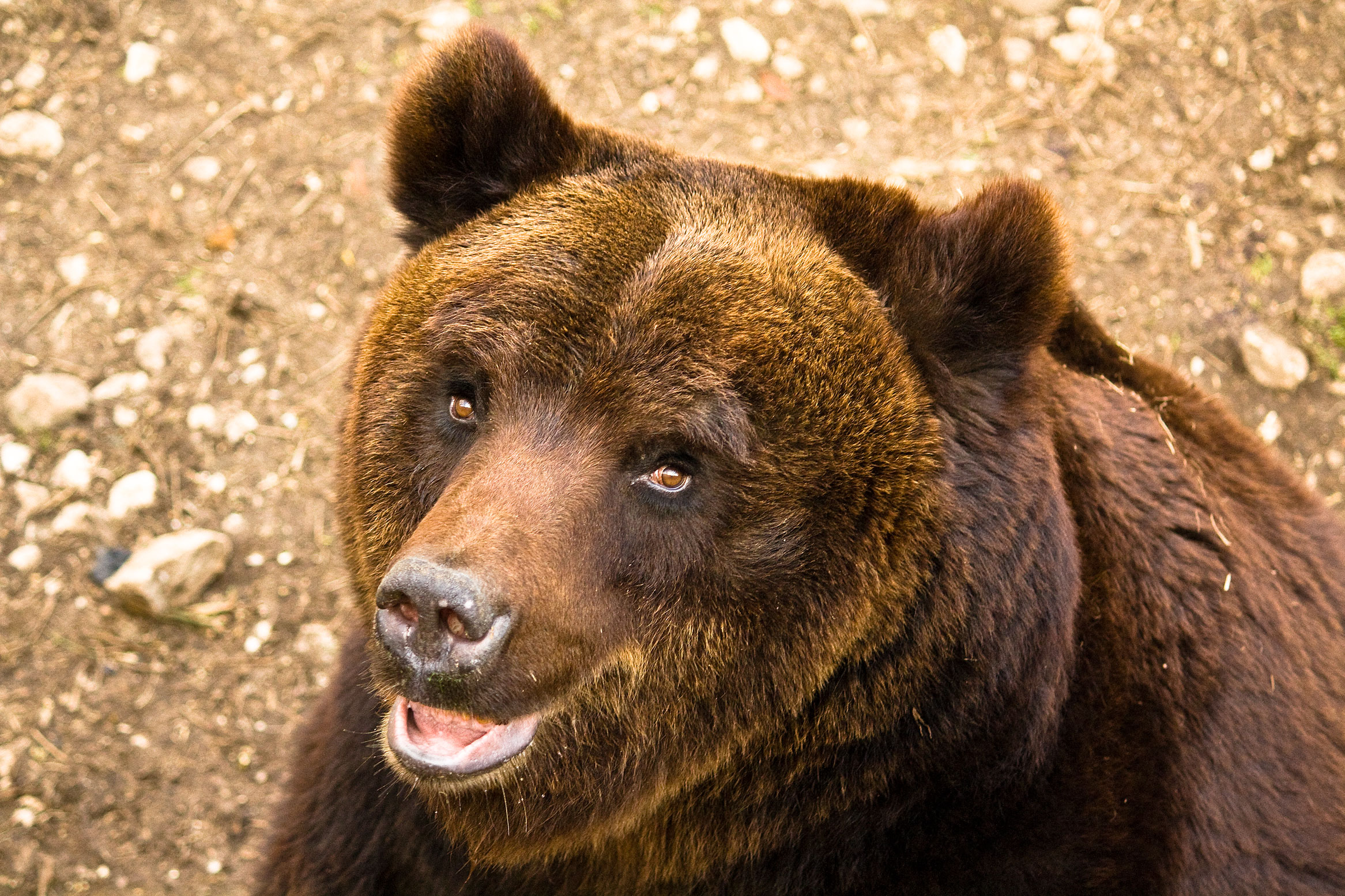
Brown bear

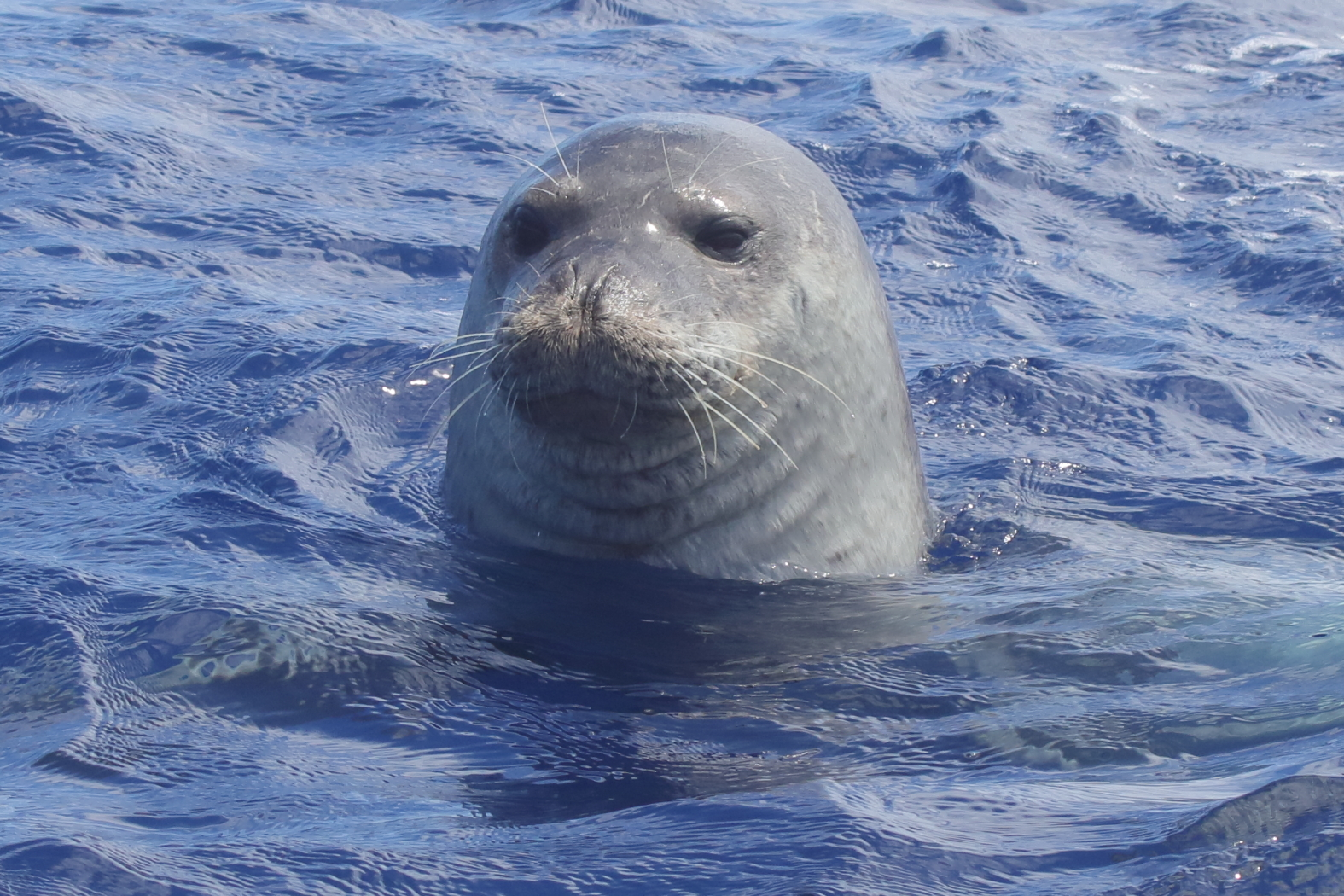
Mediterranean monk seal

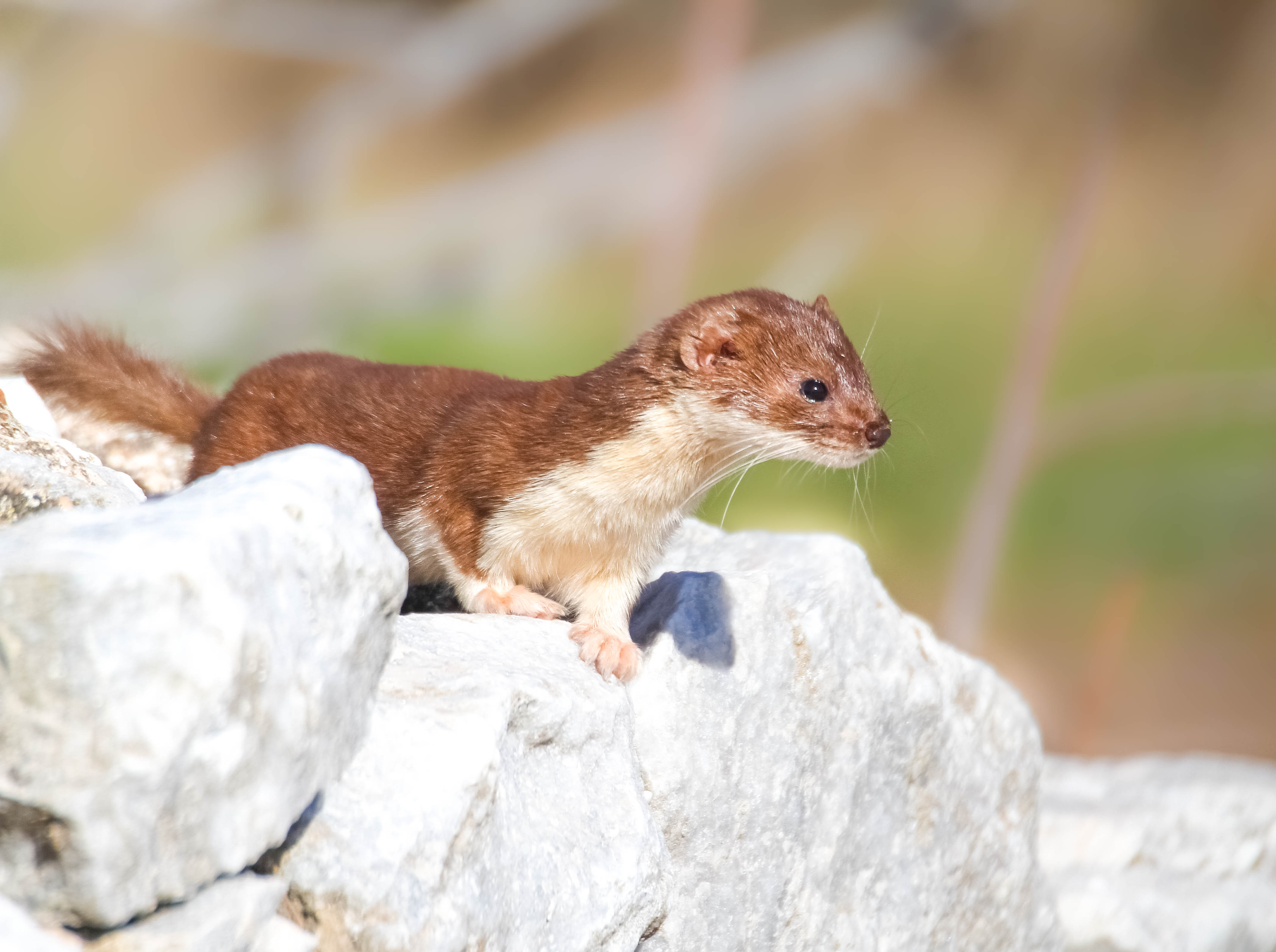
Least weasel

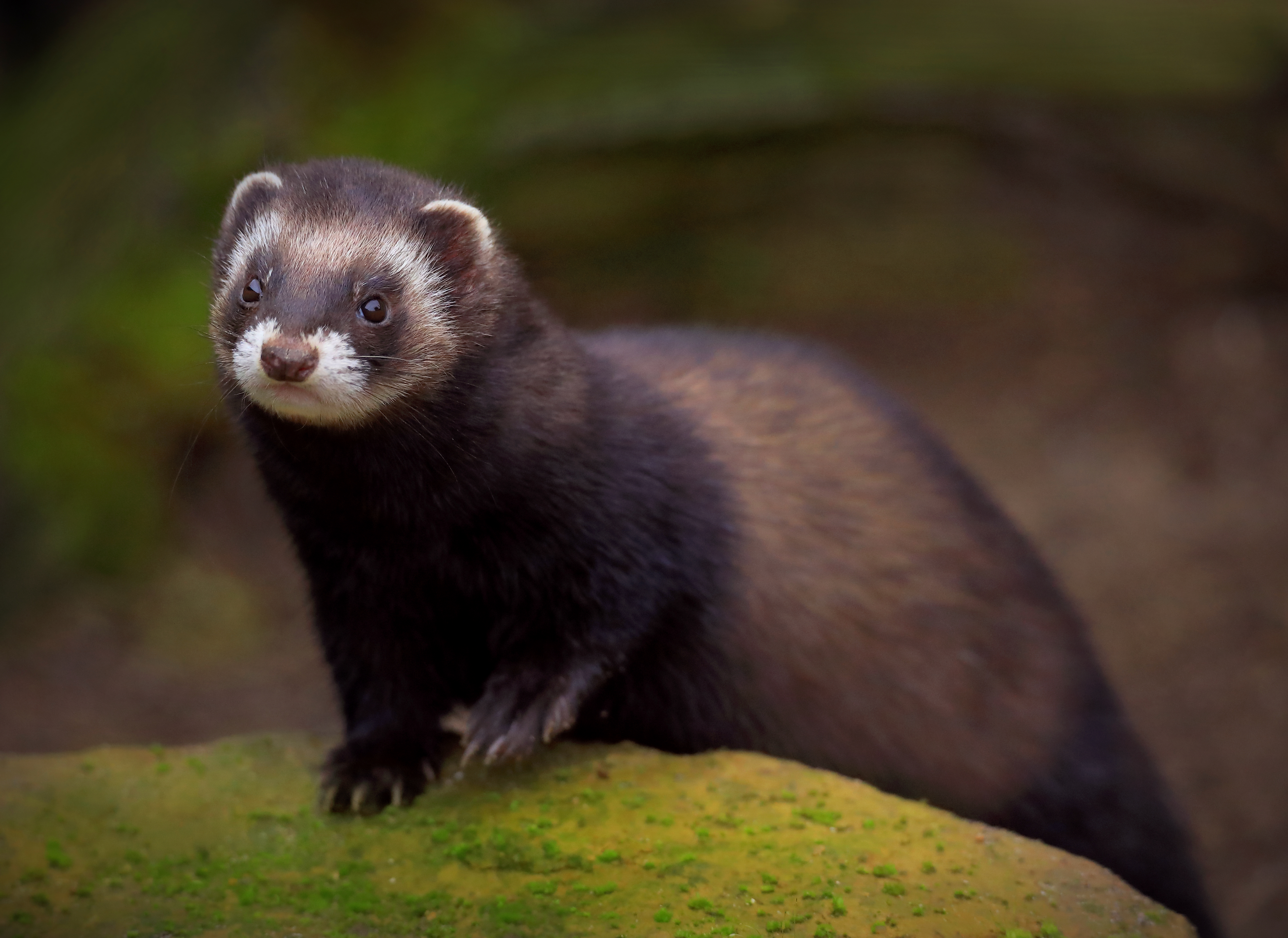
European polecat

There are over 260 species of carnivorans, the majority of which eat meat as their primary dietary item. They have a characteristic skull shape and dentition.

- Suborder: Feliformia
  - Family: Felidae (cats)
    - Subfamily: Felinae
      - Genus: Felis
        - African wildcat, F. lybica LC
        - European wildcat, F. silvestris LC
      - Genus: Lynx
        - Eurasian lynx, L. lynx LC
  - Family: Viverridae (civets, mongooses, etc.)
    - Subfamily: Viverrinae
      - Genus: Genetta
        - Common genet, G. genetta LC, vagrant
- Suborder: Caniformia
  - Family: Canidae (dogs, foxes)
    - Genus: Vulpes
      - Red fox, V. vulpes LC
    - Genus: Canis
      - Golden jackal, C. aureus LC, vagrant
        - European jackal, C. a. moreoticus
      - Gray wolf, C. lupus LC
        - Sicilian wolf, C. l. cristaldii EX, extinct in the 20th century
        - Italian wolf, C. l. italicus VU
  - Family: Ursidae (bears)
    - Genus: Ursus
      - Brown bear, U. arctos LC
        - Marsican brown bear, U. a. marsicanus/arctos CR
  - Family: Mustelidae (mustelids)
    - Genus: Lutra
      - European otter, L. lutra NT
    - Genus: Martes
      - Beech marten, M. foina LC
      - European pine marten, M. martes LC
    - Genus: Meles
      - European badger, M. meles LC
    - Genus: Mustela
      - Stoat, M. erminea LC
      - Least weasel, M. nivalis LC
      - European polecat, M. putorius LC
    - Genus: Neogale
      - American mink, N. vison LC, introduced in the 1950s
  - Family: Phocidae (earless seals)
    - Genus: Monachus
      - Mediterranean monk seal, M. monachus VU, possibly extirpated

== Order: Artiodactyla (even-toed ungulates) ==
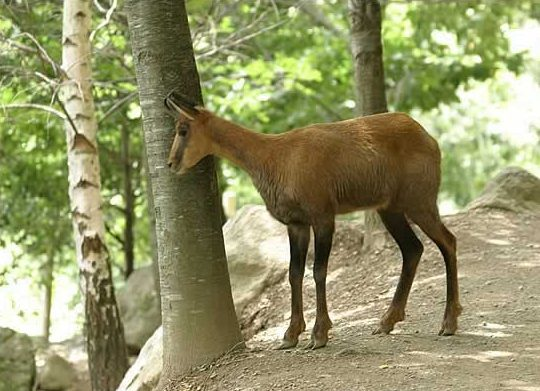
Pyrenean chamois

The even-toed ungulates are ungulates whose weight is borne about equally by the third and fourth toes, rather than mostly or entirely by the third as in perissodactyls. There are about 220 artiodactyl species, including many that are of great economic importance to humans.

- Family: Bovidae (cattle, antelope, sheep, goats)
  - Subfamily: Caprinae
    - Genus: Capra
      - Alpine ibex, C. ibex LC
    - Genus: Rupicapra
      - Pyrenean chamois, R. pyrenaica LC
        - Abruzzo chamois, R. p. ornata VU
      - Chamois, R. rupicapra LC
- Family: Cervidae (deer)
  - Subfamily: Cervinae
    - Genus: Cervus
      - Red deer, C. elaphus LC
        - Mesola deer, C.e. italicus
        - Sardinian deer, C. e. corsicanus NT
    - Genus: Dama
      - European fallow deer, D. dama LC
  - Subfamily: Capreolinae
    - Genus: Capreolus
      - Roe deer, C. capreolus LC
- Family: Suidae (pigs)
  - Subfamily: Suinae
    - Genus: Sus
      - Wild boar, S. scrofa LC

== Locally extinct ==
The following species are locally extinct in the country:

- Blasius's horseshoe bat, Rhinolophus blasii

== See also ==
- Fauna of Italy
- List of chordate orders
- Lists of mammals by region
- Mammal classification
