= List of snakes of Italy =

This list of snakes of Italy includes all snakes in the state of Italy.

== Non-venomous ==
- Natrix natrix
- Natrix helvetica
- Natrix tessellata
- Natrix maura
- Hierophis viridiflavus
- Zamenis longissimus
- Zamenis lineatus
- Zamenis situla
- Elaphe quatuorlineata
- Coronella austriaca
- Coronella girondica
- Hemorrhois hippocrepis

== Venomous ==
- Malpolon insignitus
- Malpolon monspessulanus
- Vipera Ammodytes
- Vipera aspis
- Vipera berus
- Vipera ursinii
- Vipera walser
