= List of moths of Italy =

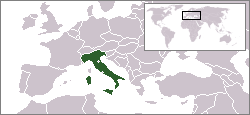
Location of Italy

There are about 4,959 species of moths in Italy. The moths (mostly nocturnal) and butterflies (mostly diurnal) together make up the taxonomic order Lepidoptera.

The links below are for moth families that have been recorded in Italy, including San Marino, Sardinia, Sicily and Vatican City.

== See also ==
- List of butterflies of Italy
