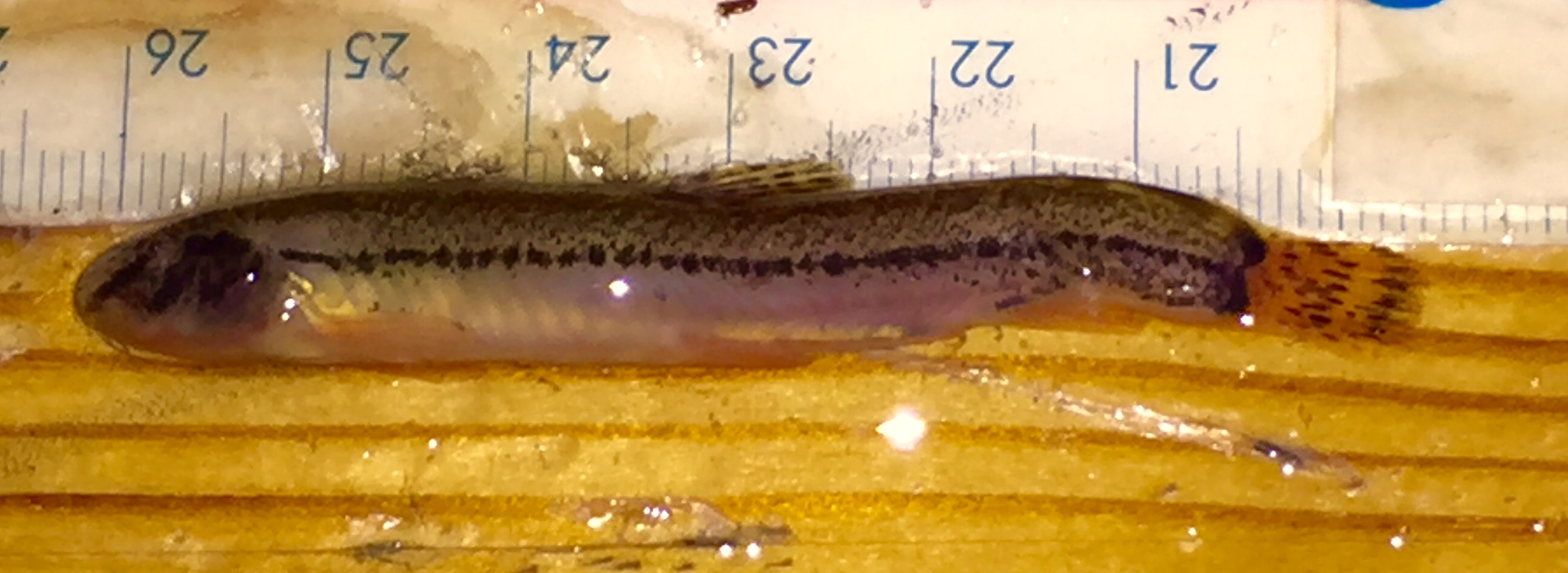

Conservation status
- Vulnerable (IUCN 3.1)

Scientific classification
- Kingdom: Animalia
- Phylum: Chordata
- Class: Actinopterygii
- Order: Cypriniformes
- Family: Cobitidae
- Genus: Sabanejewia
- Species: S. larvata

Binomial name
- Sabanejewia larvata (De Filippi, 1859)
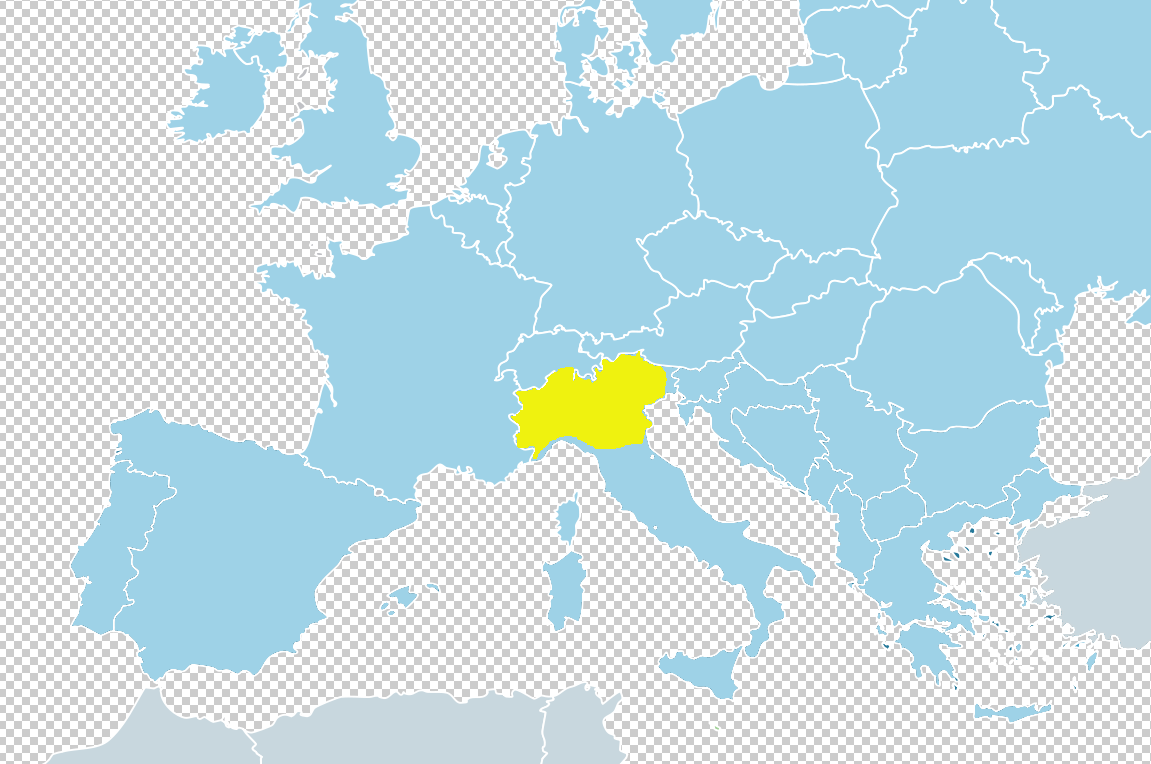

Synonyms
- Cobitis larvata De Filippi, 1859; Cobitis conspersa Cantoni, 1882

= Italian golden loach =

Species of fish

The Italian golden loach (Sabanejewia larvata) is a species of ray-finned fish in the family Cobitidae. It is threatened by habitat loss.
