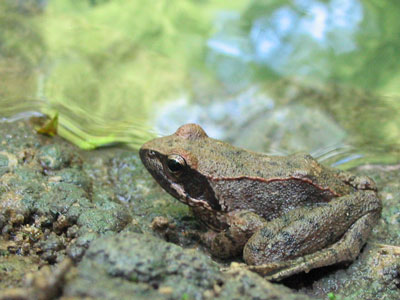
- Rana italica

Conservation status
- Least Concern (IUCN 3.1)

Scientific classification
- Kingdom: Animalia
- Phylum: Chordata
- Class: Amphibia
- Order: Anura
- Family: Ranidae
- Genus: Rana
- Species: R. italica

Binomial name
- Rana italica Dubois, 1987

Synonyms
- Rana graeca italica Dubois, 1987; Rana (Rana) italica — Dubois, 1987; Rana italica — Picariello, Scillitani & Cretella, 1990; Rana (Laurasiarana) italica — Hillis & Wilcox, 2005

= Italian stream frog =

Species of amphibian

The Italian stream frog (Rana italica), also called the Italian frog, is a species of frog in the family Ranidae. The species is endemic to Italy and San Marino.

== Description ==
Adults of R. italica have a head-body length of 7–7.5 cm (2.8–3.0 in). The hind legs are long, but not extremely so. If the hind leg is pressed forward along the body, the "heel" (tibio-tarsal articulation) does not extend beyond the snout. There are pearly granules on the ventral surfaces of the hind legs.

== Vocalization ==
The male R. italica calls only underwater. Calls are usually inaudible to a human listener, unless the calling frog is only slightly below the surface. Three different calls are known: a low repeated "grongron", a modulated "squack", and a short "uh".

== Habitat ==
The natural habitats of R. italica are rivers, intermittent rivers, swamps, freshwater marshes, and intermittent freshwater marshes.

== Conservation status ==
R. italica is threatened by habitat loss.
