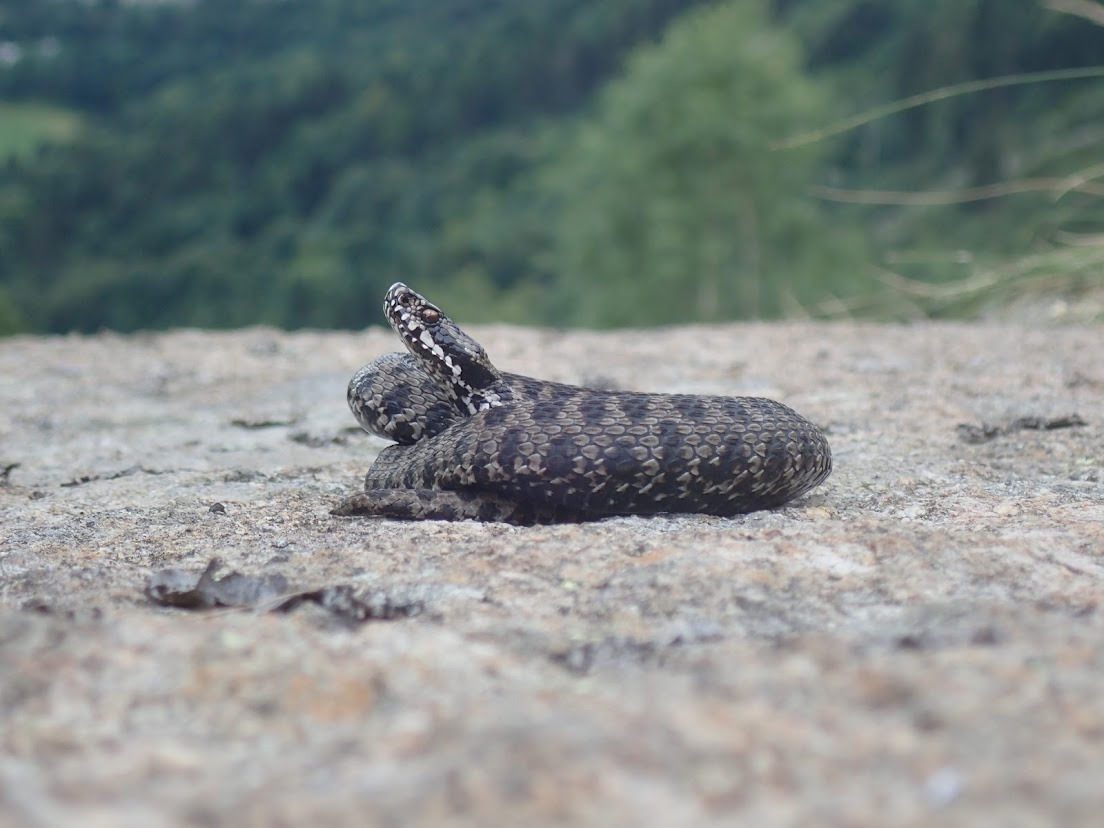

Scientific classification
- Kingdom: Animalia
- Phylum: Chordata
- Class: Reptilia
- Order: Squamata
- Suborder: Serpentes
- Family: Viperidae
- Genus: Vipera
- Species: V. walser

Binomial name
- Vipera walser Ghielmi, Menegon, Marsden, Laddaga & Ursenbacher 2016
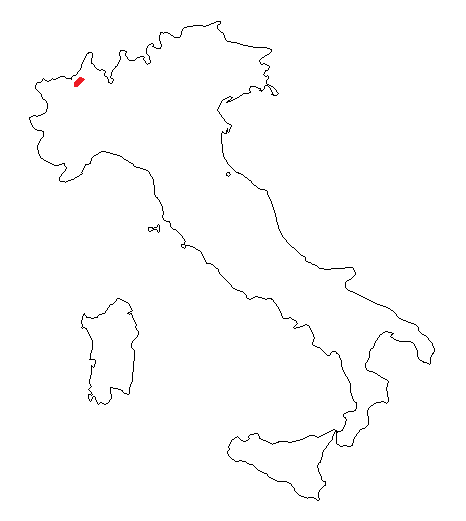

= Vipera walser =

Species of viper

Vipera walser, the Walser viper or Piedmont viper is a viper endemic to the western Italian Alps. While long considered an isolated population of Vipera berus, molecular analyses have shown it to be a distinct species related to the Vipera ursinii-complex.

== Morphology ==
Morphologically, Vipera walser closely resembles the far more widespread Vipera berus. It differs in having a higher number of cephalic scales and more frequently shows fragmentation of the cephalic large shields. Additionally, most individuals possess 1.5 to 2 rows of subocular scales at both sides of the head, while Vipera berus usually only has a single row. Colouration is highly variable, with some specimens possessing a typical dorsal zigzag pattern, and others with a reduced pattern of horizontal bars. Additionally, melanistic individuals exist.

== Geographic range ==
Vipera walser is limited to a small area in northern eastern Piedmont in the Italian western Alps, with two disjunct populations, southern population of ±225 km² confined to an area of just 500 km² north of Biella and northern population of ±45 km² in the upper Valsesia.

== Ecology ==
Vipera walser occurs in open habitats at an altitude of 1300-2300 m in valleys with high precipitation. It is mostly found on gentle south-oriented slopes with low forest cover.

== Threats and conservation ==
Due to its recent description, Vipera walser has not yet been evaluated by IUCN, although the original species description argues that the limited extent of occurrence (<1000 km²) warrants a classification as 'endangered'. Fragmented habitat, decline in agropastoral landuse, culling and collection pose short-term threats, while in the long term climate change may alter the distribution. Additionally, low genetic variability may make the species even more prone to disturbances.
