= List of mammals of Cantabria =

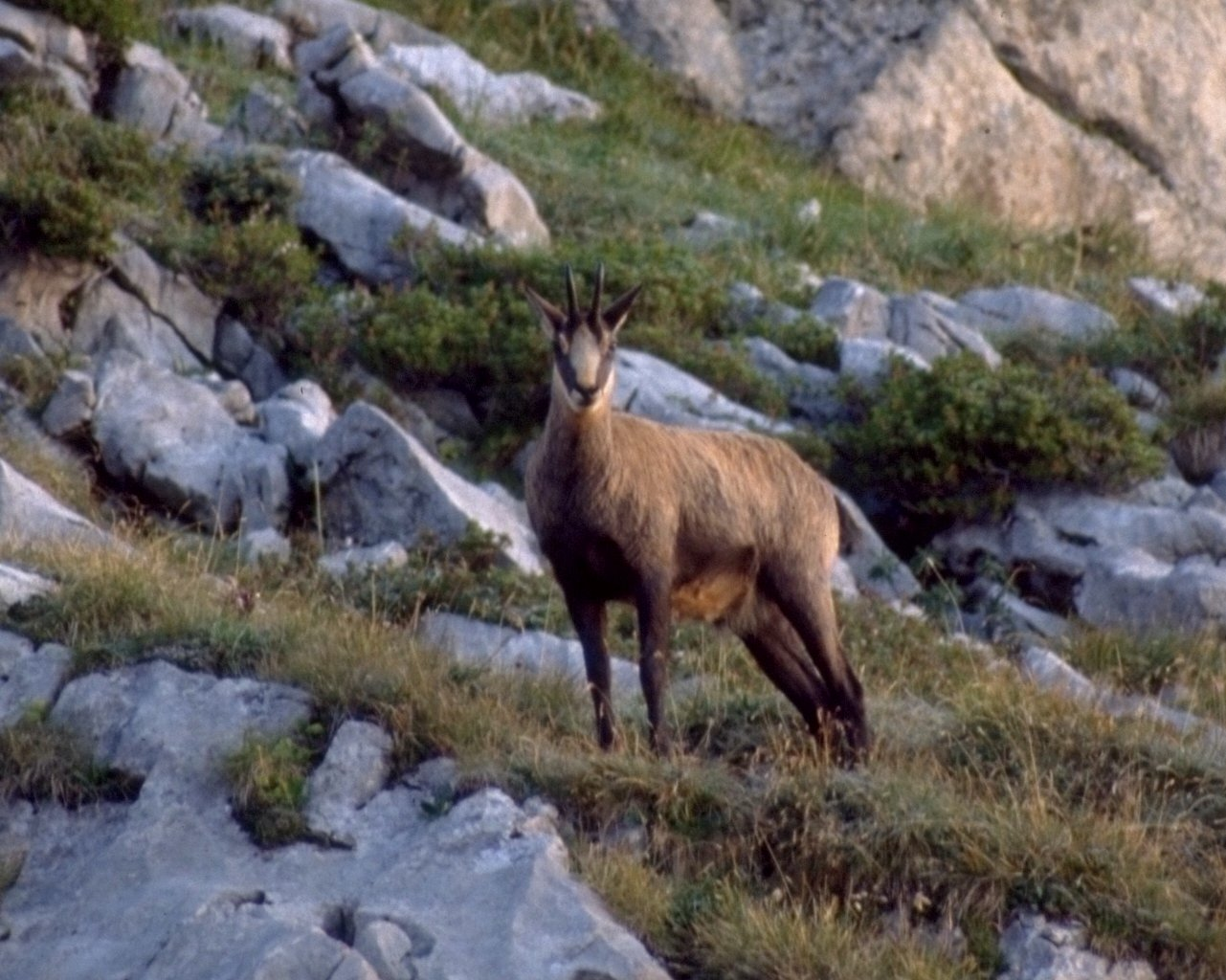
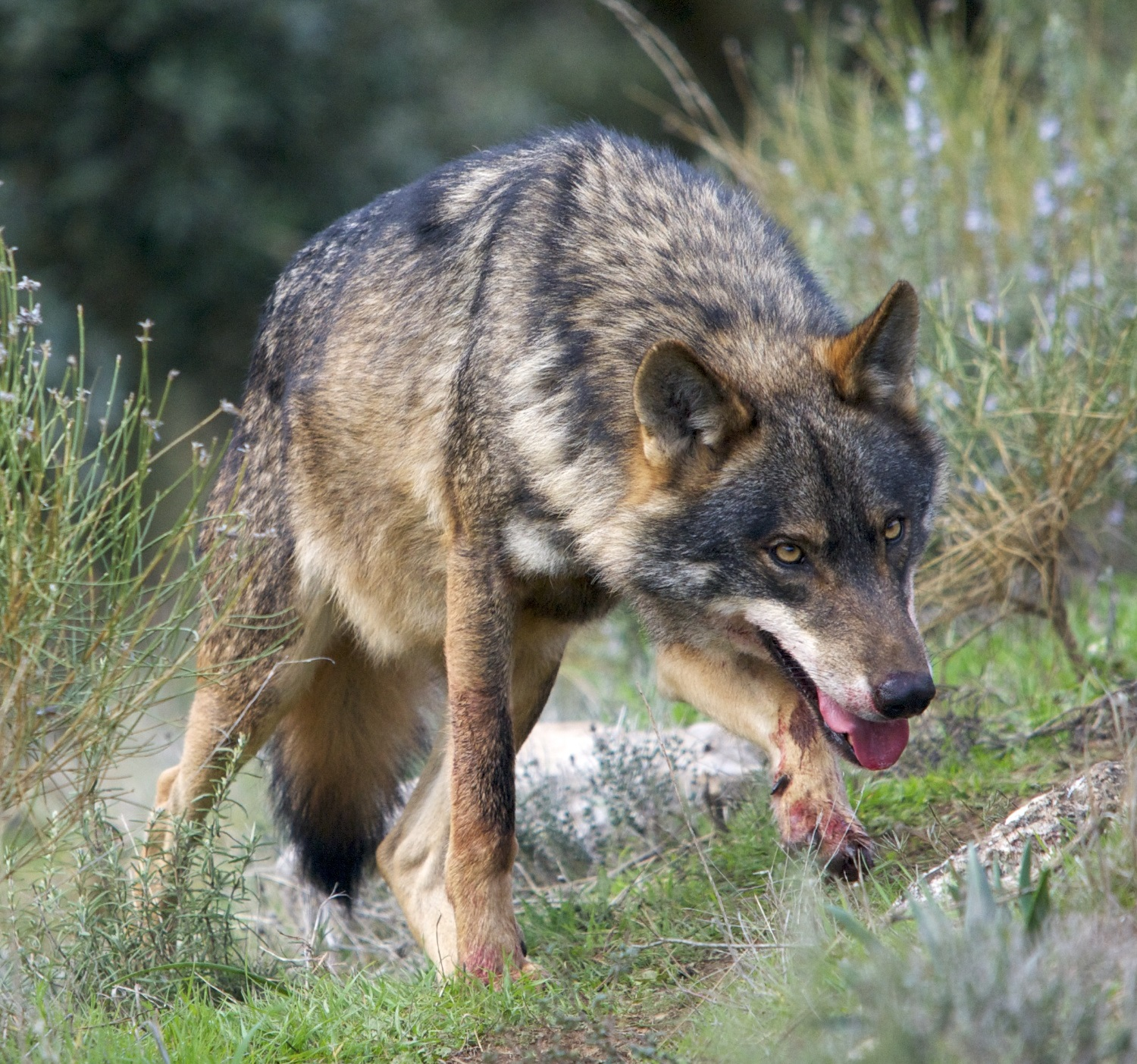
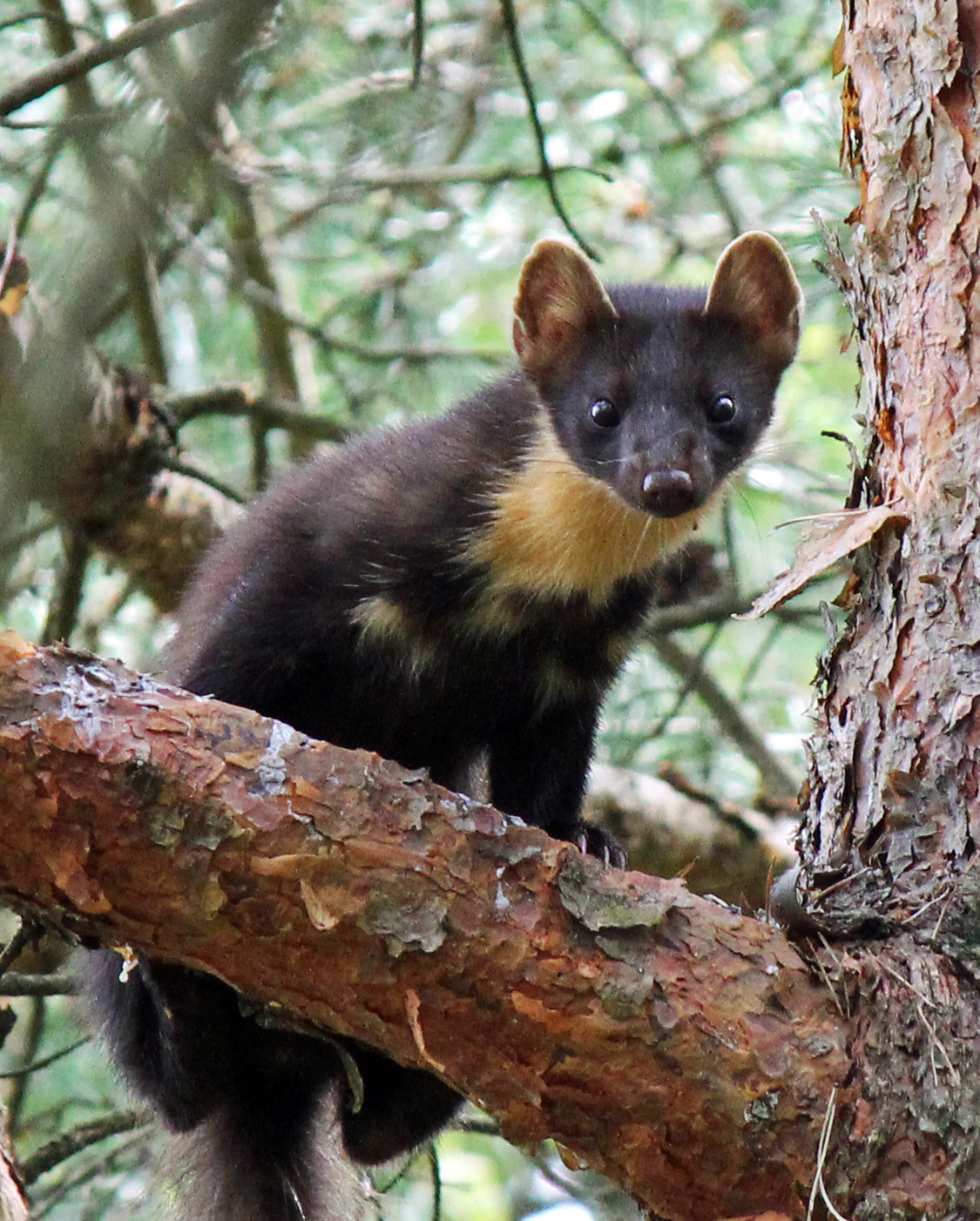
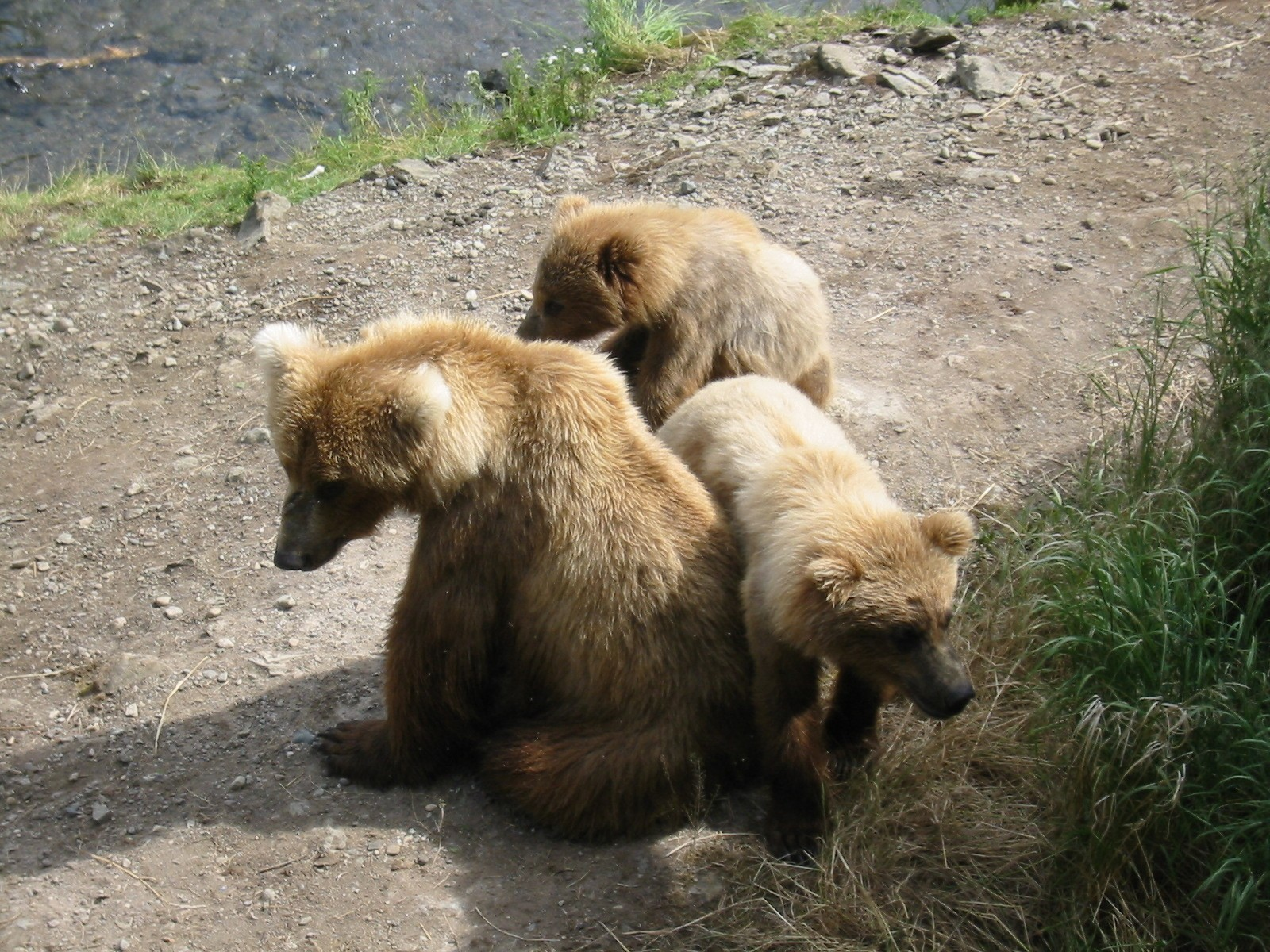
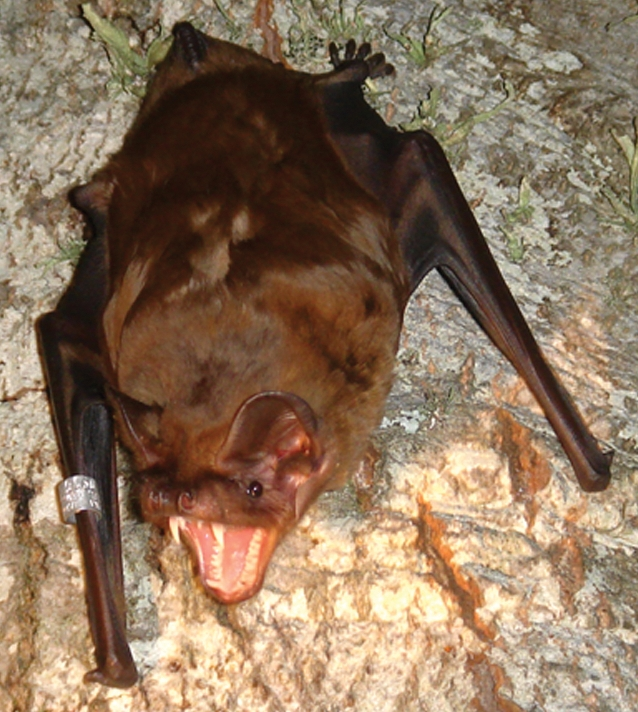
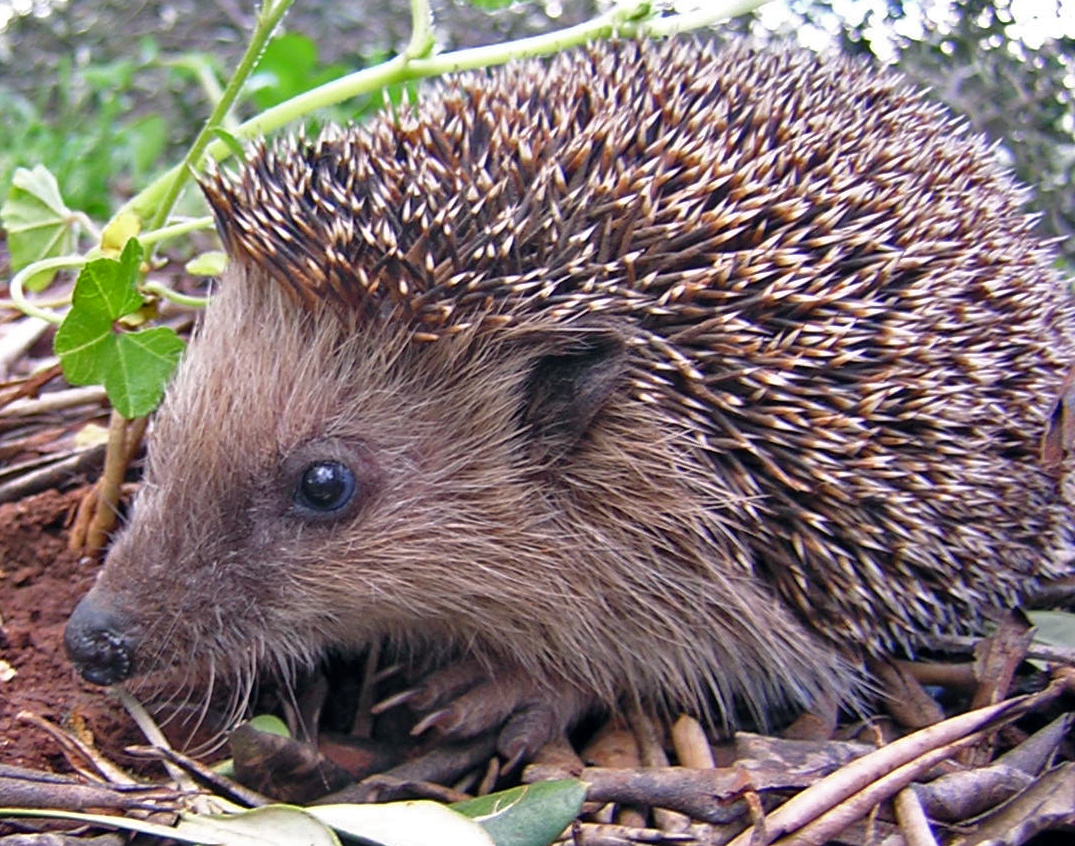
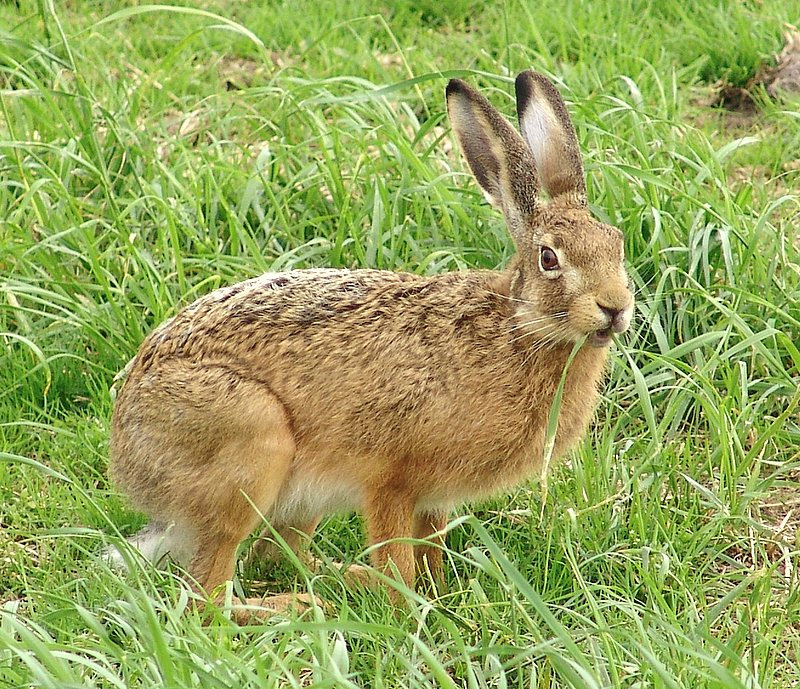
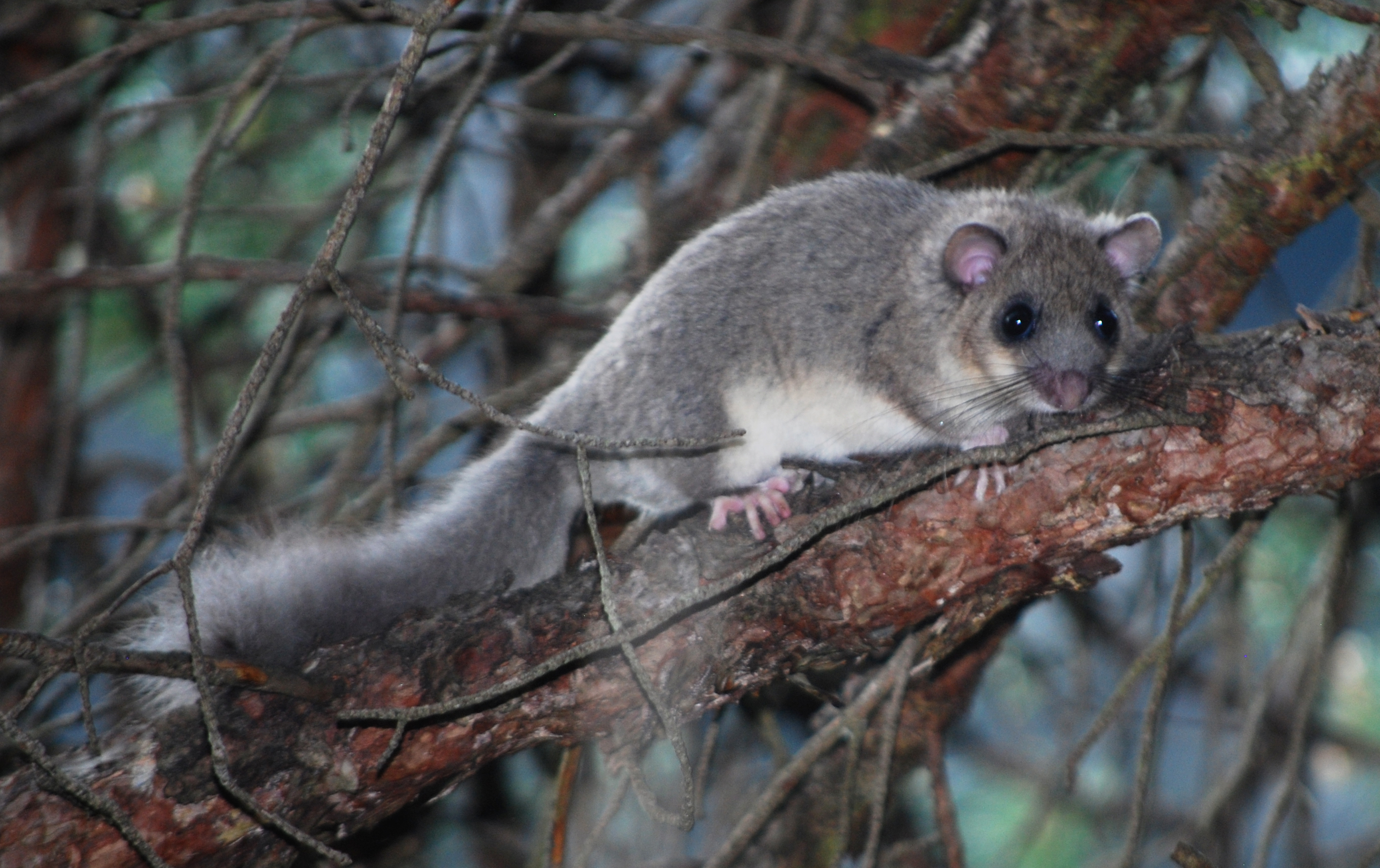
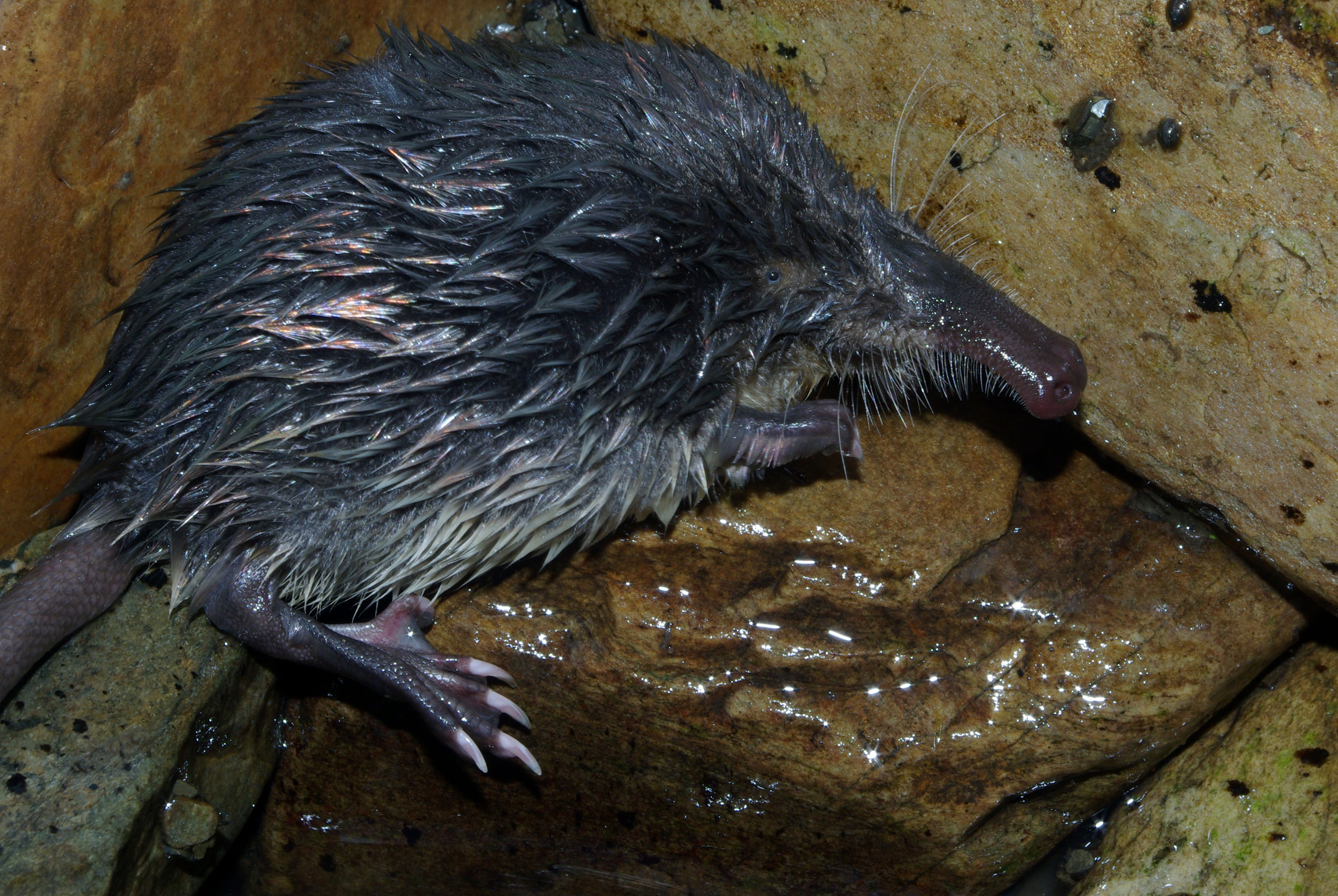
Fauna of Cantabria. From left to right and from top to bottom: Rupicapra rupicapra, Canis lupus signatus, Martes martes, Ursus arctos, Nyctalus lasiopterus, Erinaceus europaeus, Lepus europaeus, Glis glis and Galemys pyrenaicus.

The vertebrate fauna in Cantabria presents a wide diversity thanks to the variety of ecological niches existing in the community and its geographical position, equidistant between the Mediterranean region of the peninsular south and the nearby region of Atlantic Europe.

These lists show all the wild vertebrates living in Cantabria, classified according to the genus and family they belong to. In addition to the scientific name of each species, it also includes the common name in the Spanish language, the vernacular names most commonly used in this community, a brief description, a map of distribution in Spain and the conservation status.

== Mammals ==
In Cantabria, 73 species of wild mammals can be found, grouped into 20 families. (Note: Only continental mammals are included.) Some of them, such as the Spanish mole, the desman, the Granada hare and the broom hare, are considered Iberian endemisms, while others, such as the genet, the American mink or the coypu, are exotic species introduced by man.

In terms of distribution, species such as the fox or the hedgehog are abundant throughout Cantabria, unlike the hare or the brown bear, whose distribution is much more scarce and localized. The conservation status of wild mammals in Cantabria is also diverse, with sixteen species near-threatened, fifteen vulnerable and one, the brown bear, in critical danger of extinction.

=== Lagomorpha order ===
Lagomorphs (Lagomorpha, from the Greek lagōs, hare and morphē, form) are an order belonging to the placental mammals related to rodents, from which they differ by possessing two pairs of upper teeth covered with a layer of enamel. Four species of lagomorphs are found in Cantabria, all of them within the family Leporidae (rabbits and hares). Three of them are endemic to the Iberian Peninsula and some, such as the broom hare, only inhabit the mountainous areas of the northern peninsular, between Galicia, Asturias, León and Cantabria.

Leporidae Fischer von Waldheim, 1817
| Species | Common and vernacular name (VN) (Note: The vernacular name refers to the traditional name of the species in Cantabria. The main references for vernacular names are, unless otherwise indicated in the table, El lenguaje popular de la Cantabria Montañesa and the vocabulary section of the book El dialecto cabuérnigo.) | Description (Note: The following codes are used: H: Height at withers; For: Length of forearm; W: Wingspan; L: Length of head and body, excluding tail; Lt: Length of the head, body and tail; T: Length of tail; E: Ear size; We: Weight; When there is variability in the measurements, the most common range is indicated separated by a hyphen and in parentheses, the punctual records that are out of that range.) | Distribution | Status (Note: Conservation status of the species at the Spanish state level according to the Atlas and Red Books: EX : Extinct; EW : Extinct in the wild (only in captivity); CR : Critically endangered; EN : Endangered; VU : Vulnerable; NT : Near threatened; LC : Least concern; DD : Data deficient.) | Image |
|---|---|---|---|---|---|
| Lepus castroviejoi | Broom hare VN: Common to all the genus: Liebratu (leveret). | L: 49-51 cm; E: 9-9.5 cm; We: 2.6-3.4 kg. The predominant fur is brown, darker on the back, with the back of the tail, belly, "collar" and a white part of the face up to the eyes. The tips of the ears are black, as well as the dorsal side of the tail. | | VU | |
| Lepus europaeus | European hare | L: 49–56 cm; E: 9.7-11.3 cm; We: 3–4.4 kg. It is the largest hare in the Iberian Peninsula. It has long limbs and ears, the latter with black tips and yellowish-brown fur, except for the whitish belly area and little extension. | | LC | |
| Lepus granatensis | Granada hare | L: 44–47 cm; E: 9.6-10.1 cm; We: 2-2.5 kg. The fur is short and reddish-brown, streaked with black on the back and white on the muzzle, cheeks, belly, part of the legs (feet and upper part, the rest is brown) and tail. The tips of the ears and the back of the tail are black. | | LC | |
| Oryctolagus cuniculus | Rabbit | L: 34–35 cm; E: >7 cm; We: 1.5–2 kg. Thick, woolly coat, pale brown to gray, oval head and large eyes. Very short tail. Its forelegs are shorter than its hindlegs. It differs from hares because its ears, somewhat shorter, do not end in black tips and has a less elongated and slender body. | | VU | |

=== Rodentia order ===
- Rodentia
  - Myomorpha
    - Cricetidae
    - Muridae
  - Sciuromorpha
    - Gliridae
    - Sciuridae
  - Hystricomorpha
    Myocastoridae

Rodents (Rodentia) are the most versatile and numerous order of mammals, with approximately 2280 living species (42% of all living species) distributed throughout all terrestrial and freshwater habitats. Their main common feature is their two large, continuously growing incisors, with which they gnaw seeds, gnaw wood, cut food or defend themselves against predators.

Although they have developed a great variety of forms as a result of adaptation to different habitats and ecological niches, the species present in Cantabria have in common their relatively small size, thick grayish-brown fur and short legs and neck. The coypu, an invasive species native to South America and cited in the Soba valley, is the one that most deviates from the common pattern, slightly exceeding half a meter in length and six kilograms in weight.

Cricetidae Fischer von Waldheim, 1817
| Species | Common and vernacular name (VN) | Description | Distribution | Status | Image |
|---|---|---|---|---|---|
| Arvicola sapidus | Southern water vole | L: 10–15 cm; We: 140-310 g. Arvicoline of medium size. Brown dorsal coat with grayish belly with small eyes and ears, its snout is rounded and its tail is slightly longer than half of the body. It feeds mainly on vegetables found on the banks of rivers and ponds. | | VU | |
| Arvicola scherman | Montane water vole | It is a species of great morphological variability throughout its distribution area. In Cantabria it is represented by small morphotypes, with body dimensions significantly smaller than the southern water vole (Arvicola sapidus) and with a shorter tail. The coloration varies from dark brown or yellowish brown to gray, the flanks from yellowish brown or ocher to light gray; in the ventral area grayish tones predominate and the tail is generally bicolor. | | LC | |
| Chionomys nivalis | European snow vole | L: 9–14 cm; We: 35-70 g. It is one of the largest arvicolines. Quite uniform coat, grayish-brown back, white belly, generally whitish feet and tail. | | NT | |
| Microtus agrestis | Short-tailed field vole | Medium size and robust in appearance. Fairly blunt snout and relatively short tail. Ears more covered by hair than M. arvalis, very similar. Grayish-brown back with paler flanks, becoming yellowish. Throat, belly and legs gray and darker tail. | | LC | |
| Microtus arvalis | Common vole | Lt: 8–13 cm, of which a quarter corresponds to the short tail. Small rodent, of massive constitution, with short ears, not protruding at all, and broad head. The dorsal color is yellowish-brown and the ventral color is grayish-white; the young are grayish and there is no sexual dimorphism in color and carriage. | | LC | |
| Microtus gerbei | Pyrenean pine vole or Gerbe's vole | L:9.4-10.4 cm; We: 18-24 g. It is an arvicoline of small size, with elongated body and small limbs and tail. It has a short and blunt snout, relatively small eyes, compared to the other Microtus that do not belong to the subgenus Terricola. | | LC | |
| Microtus lusitanicus | Lusitanian pine vole | It is a small vole, with short ears and tail, its body shape reflects its subterranean type life: large head, blunt snout, small eyes and cylindrical body. The fur ranges from dark gray to sepia, gray belly, bicolor tail, with darker back. | | NT | |
| Myodes glareolus | Bank vole | Small rodent with reddish-brown fur and some gray patches. It lives in wooded areas and measures about 10 cm. | | LC | |

Gliridae Muirhead in Brewster, 1819
| Species | Common and vernacular name (VN) | Description | Distribution | Status | Image |
|---|---|---|---|---|---|
| Eliomys quercinus | Garden dormouse | L: 12 cm. It has a characteristic dark stripe over the eyes like a mask, a reddish-brown back and a white belly. Its long tail, completely covered with hair, ends in a tuft of black and white hairs. It is arboreal and hibernating. | | NT | |
| Glis glis | European fat dormouse | L: <19 cm. T: 12–17 cm. Uniformly gray with prominent black eyes and a long, bushy, squirrel-like tail. It is a nocturnal arboreal that becomes dormant during the winter. | | LC | |

Muridae Illiger, 1811
| Species | Common and vernacular name (VN) | Description | Distribution | Status | Image |
|---|---|---|---|---|---|
| Micromys minutus | Harvest mouse NV: Ratu (name for all mice, in general) | Lt: 4.8-7.5 cm; L: 3.9-6.5 cm; We: 6-15 g. The smallest of the murids. Short face, blunt snout and round ears, visible among the fur. The most characteristic feature of the species is the prehensile tail, characteristic of a climbing animal. Similar in color to other murids, reddish brown on the dorsal side and white on the ventral side. | | LC | |
| Apodemus flavicollis | Yellow-necked Field mouse NV: Ratu (name for all mice, in general) | Larger than Apodemus sylvaticus. They have a reddish-brown coloration, clear and bright on the back and white on the ventral area. | | LC | |
| Apodemus sylvaticus | Wood mouse NV: Ratu (name for all mice, in general) | L: 8–10 cm; Lt: 16–20 cm. Small rodent. Tail hairless, always equal to or larger than the rest of the body. The coloration of the animal is reddish-yellow on the upper part, while the belly is whitish and clearly delimited by color. | | LC | |
| Rattus norvegicus | Brown rat or Norway rat | L: 21–27 cm; Lt:38–49 cm; We: 280-520 g. The body is coarse and the tail is covered with ringed scales; the coat is dark gray on the back. The snout is blunter and the ears shorter than those of the black rat (Rattus rattus). | | LC | |
| Rattus rattus | Black rat | L: 16–22 cm; Lt: 33–46 cm; We: 150-230 g. Hairless tail covered with ringed scales. The muzzle is pointed. The coat is black or gray one. They live from 2 to 3 years. It climbs better than the gray and prefers high places. | | LC | |
| Mus musculus | House mouse NV: Ratu (name for all mice, in general) | Lt: 15–19 cm; We: 12-40 g. The tail is slightly more than half of its length. Its coat is short and of gray tones, which lighten on the belly. | | LC | |
| Mus apretus | Algerian mouse NV: Ratu (name for all mice, in general) | Lt: 7.5-9.35 cm; L: 6.0-7.65 cm. Small-sized murid, with rounded snout, small eyes and ears. They have a chestnut gray dorsal coloration, with a darker stripe from the head to the beginning of the tail, grayish white belly, clearly separated from the dorsum. It is easily differentiated from Mus musculus by its coloration and by the relative length of the tail, which is much shorter than the body. | | LC | |

Myocastoridae Ameghino, 1902
| Species | Common and vernacular name (VN) | Description | Distribution | Status | Image |
|---|---|---|---|---|---|
| Myocastor coypus | Coypu | Lt: 59,3-60,3 cm; We: 6-6,5 (10) kg. A large rodent with a shiny brown coat, denser on the back, introduced in the northern peninsula from specimens that escaped from fur farms in France. It has several adaptations to semi-aquatic life: webbed hindlimbs; small ears; eyes and nostrils located on the dorsal part of the head. | | LC | |

Sciuridae G. Fischer von Waldheim, 1817
| Species | Common and vernacular name (VN) | Description | Distribution | Status | Image |
|---|---|---|---|---|---|
| Sciurus vulgaris | Red squirrel NV: Esquilu, isquilu, risquilu, inguila. | L: 19.5-24.7 cm; Lt: 14–19.5 cm; We: 300 g. A medium-sized arboreal squirrel with a long, bushy tail and tufted ear tips. They are generally reddish in color, those of the northern forests darker than the Mediterranean ones. | | LC | |

=== Eulipotyphla order ===
==== Erinaceomorpha suborder ====
The erinaceomorphs (Erinaceomorpha) are a suborder of placental mammals that includes a single family, the erinaceids (Erinaceidae), formerly included in the former order Insectivora. It includes the well-known hedgehogs of Eurasia and Africa and the subfamily Galericinae of Southeast Asia.

Erinaceidae G. Fischer von Waldheim, 1814
| Species | Common and vernacular name (VN) | Description | Distribution | Status | Image |
|---|---|---|---|---|---|
| Erinaceus europaeus | European hedgehog NV: Oriciu, irizu. | L: 19–29 cm; We: 0.5-1.2 kg. With a stocky body covered with spikes on the back and flanks, the hedgehog has a mobile, pointed snout, small, rounded eyes and ears, and a brown face, belly and limbs. Males are slightly larger than females. | | LC | |

==== Soricomorpha suborder ====
The soricomorphs (Soricomorpha) are a suborder of placental mammals containing the families Nesophontidae, Solenodontidae, Soricidae, and Talpidae. Members of this order belonged to the extinct order Insectivora. Moles and shrews belong to this order.

Soricidae G. Fischer von Waldheim, 1817
| Species | Common and vernacular name (VN) | Description | Distribution | Status | Image |
|---|---|---|---|---|---|
| Sorex minutus | Eurasian pygmy shrew | L: 6 cm; T: 4–5 cm; We: less than 6 g. Dark brown fur on the back that gradually lightens towards the belly. Apices of the teeth red. | | LC | |
| Sorex coronatus | Crowned shrew | Similar to S. araneus but slightly smaller. Variable fur, generally dark brown back, lighter flanks and grayish-brown belly. | | LC | |
| Neomys fodiens | Eurasian water shrew | Larger than N. anomalus, Lt: 68–97 mm; We: 10-23 g. Semi-aquatic animal, wide hind third of body, large feet, stiff hairs on hands and feet. Dorsal fur dark, almost black, and silver-gray belly with brownish, reddish or black reflections. | | LC | |
| Neomys anomalus | Iberian water shrew | L: 6–9 cm; Lt: 10–15 cm; We: 7.5-16 g. Variable color, belly always light, almost whitish, and bicolor tail. Ears completely hidden in the fur, thick snout and maroon teeth. Swimming bristles less developed than in N. fodiens, because it is less attached to water. | | LC | |
| Crocidura russula | Greater white-toothed shrew | L: 34–47 mm; We: 7-14 g; Lt: 64–87 mm. Medium size, small eyes and well-developed, highly visible ear pinnae. The uniform gray fur varies with age, time of year and geographic location. | | LC | |
| Crocidura suaveolens | Lesser white-toothed shrew | Similar to C. russula. Brownish back, grayish belly sometimes yellowish. Tail with characteristic long hairs. In Europe and the Iberian Peninsula, the southernmost populations are larger. | | LC | |

Talpidae G. Fischer von Waldheim, 1814
| Species | Common and vernacular name (VN) | Description | Distribution | Status | Image |
|---|---|---|---|---|---|
| Galemys pyrenaicus | Pyrenean desman | Muzzle with well developed trunk. Robust and agile hindlegs. Front part of the body similar to that of a mole, with forelegs adapted for digging. It has a musk gland on the caudal boot. | | VU | |
| Talpa europaea | European mole NV: Common to all moles: Aron (for its quality of making furrows). | L: 10–15 cm; We: 3 cm. Cylindrical body, pointed snout and very small eyes. Without ear pinnae. Forelegs spade-shaped, broad and provided with strong claws. | | LC | |
| Talpa occidentalis | Spanish mole | Smaller than T. europaea, eyes completely covered by hair, skull more elongated and narrower and white hairs covering the hands and muzzle. | | LC | |

=== Chiroptera order ===
The chiroptera or bats are an order of placental mammals whose upper limbs developed as wings. Three families of Chiroptera are present in Cantabria: the molossids, the rhinolophids or horseshoe bats and the vespertilionids.

Of all of them, the most numerous is the family of vespertilionids, composed of twenty species gathered in six genera: for the genus Myotis; Myotis myotis, M. blythii, M. natereri, M. daubentonii, M. bechstenii, M. emarginata, M. mystacinus, M. capaccini, for the genus Miniopterus; miniopterus schreibersii, for the genus Nyctalus; Nyctalus noctula, N. lesiopterus, N. leisleri; for the genus Pipistrellus; Pipistrellus pipistrellus, P. pygmaeus, P. kuhlii, P. nathusii, P. savii; for the genus Plecotus, the Plecotus auritus and Plecotus austriacus; for the genus Eptesicus the Eptesicus seronitus and for the genus Barbastella a single species Barbastella barbastellus. The family of horseshoe bats includes three species: the large horseshoe bat (Rhinolophus ferrumequinum) of large size, the small horseshoe bat (Rhinolophus hipposideros) and the Mediterranean horseshoe bat (Rhinolophus euryale). Finally, the molossidae family includes the species Tadarida teniotis.

Molossidae Gervais in de Castelnau, 1855
| Species | Common and vernacular name (VN) | Description | Distribution | Status | Image |
|---|---|---|---|---|---|
| Tadarida teniotis | European free-tailed bat | For: 57–64 mm; L: 12 cm; We: 22-54 g. Large bat with long and narrow wings, head typical of the genus, rigid ears projected forward. The tail protrudes from the caudal membrane and in flight retracts into the uropatagium. Echolocation signals around 15-9 kHz. Tooth formula:$\frac{1.1.2.3}{3.1.2.3}$ | | NT | |

Rhinolophidae Gray, 1821
| Species | Common and vernacular name (VN) | Description | Distribution | Status | Image |
|---|---|---|---|---|---|
| Rhinolophus euryale | Mediterranean horseshoe bat NV: Common to all the family (Spanish) murcielago, murciágano/u, murciégano, sapulatu/o, spulatu,sapalatu, saparnatu, sapu jelau. | For: 44–50.5 mm; L: 42–58 mm; W: 38 cm; We: 7.2-16 g. Intermediate size between R. ferrumequinum and R. hipposideros. Saddle pointed and slightly inclined. Horseshoe with three vertical furrows. Inside of the ears are pinkish. At rest, it keeps its wings almost tucked up, showing almost all of its pectoral area. Echolocation signals around 105–102 kHz. | | VU | |
| Rhinolophus ferrumequinum | Greater horseshoe bat | For: 50,5-60,2 mm; We: 14,6-31,6 g. It is the largest representative of the genus Rhinolophus in Europe. It has a single conspicuous groove on the lower lip. Echolocation signals around 81–78 kHz. | | VU | |
| Rhinolophus hipposideros | Lesser horshoe bat | For: 35.2–39 mm; L: 37–45 mm; W: 19.2-29.5 cm; We: 3.7-6 g (largest male). It is the smallest species of the genus Rhinolophus. Echolocation signals around 115–106 kHz. Tooth formula common to all Rhinolophus:$\frac{1.1.2.3}{2.1.3.3}$ | | NT | |

Vespertilionidae Gray, 1821
| Species | Common and vernacular name (VN) | Description | Distribution | Status | Image |
|---|---|---|---|---|---|
| Barbastella barbastellus | Western barbastelle NV: Common to all the family (Spanish) murcielago, murciágano/u, murciégano, sapulatu/o, spulatu,sapalatu, saparnatu, sapu jelau. | For: 35–42.5 mm; We: 5.6-13.7 g (larger female). Medium-sized bat, with large quadrangular ears, joined at the forehead at their inner edge. The fur is dark, between blackish and brownish. Echolocation signals around 43-41 and 37–32 kHz and irregular rhythm. T.f..:$\frac{2.1.2.3}{3.1.2.3}$ | | VU | |
| Eptesicus serotinus | Serotine bat | For: 46–55 mm; We: 17-28 g (larger female). Dark brown fur on the back and lighter belly. The young are grayish in color. The ears are triangular and short and the tragus is linear with a rounded end. The wing membranes are inserted at the base of the feet. Echolocation signals around 26 kHz. T.f.:$\frac{2.1.1.3}{3.1.2.3}$ | | LC | |
| Hypsugo savii | Savi's pipistrelle | For: 31.6-37.5 mm; L: 40–54 mm; We: 5-10 g. Membranes, ears and face black. Ears short, separated at their base and wider and rounder than Pipistrellus. Swallow short and rounded. Dense and quite long fur. Upper incisors with two tips and first premolar very small or absent. Echolocation signals around 38–30 kHz. T.f..:$\frac{2.1.2.3}{3.1.2.3}$ | | NT | |
| Miniopterus schreibersii | Common bent-wing bat | For: 42,9-49,9 mm; L: 42,9-49,9 mm; We: 10,1-20,8 g. Very short snout and flattened and protruding profile; the ears are small and triangular and the tragus is short, rounded and projected inward. The wings are long and narrow. The fur is short and dense, grayish brown on the back and paler on the belly. Echolocation signals around 55 kHz. T.f.:$\frac{2.1.2.3}{3.1.3.3}$ | | VU | |
| Myotis alcathoe | Alcathoe bat | Similar to M. mystacinus, M. brandtii and M . ikonnikovi in morphology. It is the smallest species of the whiskered bats. Highest frequency echolocation signals among all European Myotis. T.f.: $\frac{2.1.3.3}{3.1.3.3}$ | | DD | |
| Myotis bechsteinii | Bechstein's bat | For: 39–47 mm; L: 23–26 mm; We: 7-14 g. Ears broad and long, larger than in other Myotis, separated at the base contrary to Plecotus, with nine transverse folds on the outer edge and long lancet-shaped tragus. Long fur, dark brown back and light gray belly. Hatchlings light gray. Straight spur of length 1/3-1/2 of the uropatagium. Last caudal vertebra free. The plagiopatagium begins at the base of the toes. Echolocation signals between 80 and 30 kHz. | | VU | |
| Myotis blythii | Lesser mouse-eared bat | For: 50.5–62 mm; We: 18–29.5 g. Similar to M. myotis and M. punicus, but more slender and with a thinner snout. Its ear is less than 26 mm. White spot on the frontal fur. Emits pulses similar to M. myotis, from 62 to 28 kHz. Tooth formula common to all myotis:$\frac{2.1.3.3}{3.1.3.3}$ | | VU | |
| Myotis daubentonii | Daubenton's bat | For: 33,2-38,7 mm; L: 45–55 mm; W: 240–275 mm; We: 7-15 g. Brownish gray back and silvery gray belly. The young have darker fur. Face of a pinkish hue, hairless area around the eyes. Tail and wing membranes are dark brown. Echolocation signals between 69 and 25 kHz. | | LC | |
| Myoris emarginatus | Geoffroy's bat | For: 37.8-42.6 mm; We: 7.4-11.5 g (larger female). Size medium-small, ears of medium length with a more marked notch than in other species. Short and pointed snout. Reddish blond back and yellowish belly. Plagiopatagium inserted at the base of the outermost toe. Juveniles darker, without reddish tones. | | VU | |
| Myotis escalerai | Escalera's bat | For: 35,6-41,9 mm; We: 4,9-8,5 g. Smaller, light belly, dark dorsum and pointed tragus. Fringe of stiff hairs on edge of uropatagium, spur sinuously shaped. | | NT | |
| Myotis myotis | Greater mouse-eared bat | For: 56.5-62.3 mm; We: 21-35 g (larger female). Short, dense hair, with a dark base and chestnut to grayish-brown back, belly almost white. Young ashy gray, reddish-brown skin. Broad muzzle with glandular bumps. Uropatagium hairless, with a spur covering half of its edge. Emits pulses similar to M. blythii, 62 to 28 kHz. | | VU | |
| Myotis mystacinus | Whiskered bat | For: 33–34.9 mm; We: 3.9-4.5 g. Small bat with long fur. It is similar to M. brandtii and M. alcathoe. The spur only reaches half of the free edge of the uropatagium. Echolocation signals from 75 to 32 kHz. | | VU | |
| Myotis nattereri | Natterer's bat | Brownish fur and wings of a lighter shade. Its color is also brown on the wing membrane, becoming white on the belly. | | NT | |
| Nyctalus lasiopterus | Greater noctule bat | For: 61.3-67.8 mm. It is the largest European bat. It has no sexual dimorphism. Brown to reddish fur, lighter or yellowish on the belly. Dense, long, lustrous fur, extending over the patagium. Ears short, wide and rounded, thick antitragus, large and kidney-shaped swallow. Long and relatively narrow wings inserted in the ankle. Robust dentition. Echolocation signals in two pulses of 17 kHz and 15.3 kHz. | | VU | |
| Nactalus leisleri | Lesser noctule bat or Leisler's bat | For: 39–47 mm; L: 48–68 mm; W: 26–33 cm; We: 8-23.2 g. Medium size, smaller than N. noctula. Face, ears and wings dark. Brown fur, darker on the belly than on the back. Base of the arms covered with hair. Short ears of rounded shape similar to a mushroom. Long and narrow wings. Echolocation signals in two pulses with maximum energy frequencies between 31 and 23 kHz. | | NT | |
| Nyctalus noctula | Common noctule | For: 48–58 mm; We: 18-40 g. Large, rounded ears with rounded tragus. Muzzle short and broad, wings long and narrow inserting at the ankles. Golden brown fur. Wings, ears and snout dark brown. Echolocation signals in two pulses with frequencies of 45–25 kHz and 25–19 kHz. Tooth formula common to all Nyctalus: $\frac{2.1.2.3}{3.1.2.3}$ | | VU | |
| Pipistrellus kuhlii | Kuhl's pipistrelle NV: Common to the whole genus (Spanish): pistruello, pipistruello, pipistrello,pistrueyu, esperteyu. | For: 31–37 mm; L: 40–50 mm; W: 210–230 mm; We: 5-10 g. Muzzle fat and short. Triangular ears, rounded-tipped snout. The tail protrudes 1 mm from the uropatagium. The fifth toe measures between 44 and 45 millimeters. Variable coat, yellowish brown or reddish back and light gray belly. Dark brown ears, muzzle and patagium. White stripe of 2 mm, visible and well delimited on the posterior edge of the wing membrane, between the fifth toe and the foot. Tooth formula common to the whole genus: $\frac{2.1.2.3}{3.1.2.3}$ | | LC | |
| Pipistrellus nathusii | Nathusius's pipistrelle | For: 32–37 mm; L: 44–58 mm; W: 230–250 mm; We: 6–15.5 g. Muzzle large and short. Triangular ears, short rounded-tipped tragus. Dorsal part of the uropatagium covered with hair up to the middle and the belly part only along the leg. The tail protrudes less than 1 mm from the uropatagium and the fifth toe is about 46 mm long. Dorsal coat reddish brown in summer, darker in autumn. Belly light brown or yellowish. Muzzle, ears and wing membranes blackish brown. | | NT | |
| Pipistrellus pipistrellus | Common pipistrelle | For: 28–35 mm; L: 3.5–5 cm; W: 19–25 cm; We: 3.5-8.5 g. Narrow wings. Ears short, triangular with rounded corners. Tragus kidney-shaped, rounded tip and especially long and developed. Premaxillary bone fused to the maxilla. Muzzle short with glandular bulges on both sides next to the labial glands (mouthparts), whitish in color. Skin brown, of variable shades, but usually darker than in P. pygmaeus. Wing and tail membranes darker and hairless. Skin of the face darker than the rest of the body, sometimes reaching black. | | LC | |
| Pipistrellus pygmaeus | Soprano pipistrelle | L: 36–51 mm; We: 3,5-8,5 g. The smallest bat in Europe. Variable brownish-olive fur, pale sandy on the back and lighter belly. Lighter than P. pipistrellus. Light patches on the skin of the face. Coat on the dorsum of the uropatagium denser and more extended than P. pipistrellus. | | LC | |
| Plecotus auritus | Brown long-eared bat | For: 36.9-43.5 mm; L: 45–48 mm; W: 39 mm; We: 6.8-12 g. Medium-sized bat with very large ears, up to 30 mm, which give it its name. It has a more or less cylindrical penis, ending in a pointed tip. They are relatively slow fliers and emit echolocation signals from 83 to 26 kHz. | | NT | |
| Plecotus austriacus | Grey long-eared bat | For: 37–45 mm; L: 37–45 mm; We: 6.5-15 g (largest female). Medium size. Very large ears attached to the head by their inner edges. Dark gray back and whitish or very pale gray belly. Echolocation signals from 85 to 25 kHz. F.d. common to all Plecotus: $\frac{2.1.2.3}{3.1.3.3}$ | | NT | |

=== Carnivora order ===
The carnivores (Carnivora) are an order of placental mammals, characterized by the shape of their molars. It takes its name from the adaptation of most of its members to meat consumption; although several are omnivores.

Canidae G. Fischer von Waldheim, 1817
| Species | Common and vernacular name (VN) | Description | Distribution | Status | Image |
|---|---|---|---|---|---|
| Canis lupus signatus | Iberian wolf NV: (in Spanish) lobu, lubu,lubucu (wolverine, Spanish: lobezno). | L: 120–180 cm; T: 40 cm; H: 70–80 cm; We: 28–46 kg. The Iberian wolf (C. l. signatus), a smaller wolf than other European wolves, has a characteristic dark stripe on the forelegs, another dark patch along the tail and another around the withers (saddle-shaped). | | NT | |
| Vulpes vulpes | Red fox NV: raposu/u, raposa. | L: 52–80 cm; T: 32–48 cm; We: 3–8.6 kg. Small canid with reddish tones and solitary habits, it has a long and bushy tail with a white tip. The ears and the ends of the legs are black. | | LC | |

Felidae G. Fischer von Waldheim, 1817
| Species | Common and vernacular name (VN) | Description | Distribution | Status | Image |
|---|---|---|---|---|---|
| Felis silvestris | European wildcat NV: (in Spanish) gatu montés. | L: 48.5–65 cm; T: 25–34.5 cm, We: 3–7.5 kg. The European wildcat (F. s. silvestris) is larger and more robust than the domestic cat and incapable of meowing. Gray brindle in color, it has 3 to 5 dark rings on its short tail, which ends in a rounded black tip. | | NT | |

Mustelidae G. Fischer von Waldheim, 1817
| Species | Common and vernacular name (VN) | Description | Distribution | Status | Image |
|---|---|---|---|---|---|
| Mustela erminea | Stoat or ermine NV: (in Spanish) villería. | L: 22–28 cm; T: 7–12 cm; We: 110-330 g. The stoat has an elongated and flexible body and a brownish fur on the back and white or yellowish white on the chest and belly. The tip of the tail is black. In colder regions, it moults its fur becoming entirely white. | | LC | |
| Mustela nivalis | Least weasel or little weasel NV: (in Spanish) Monuca galana, monuca, mona, bonuca, galana/uca, mostolilla, camisuela, villería/uca (when confused with the stoat, «true villería»), bilidilla, campizuca, campizuela, juricahuevos, paniquesa,bonita, billería/uca, mustelilla, mosta, rosmila, rosmilla. | L: 16.5–25 cm; T: 4–8.5 cm; We: 49-223 g. It is the smallest mustelid, it looks like a reduced version of M. erminea with its spring coat. Its body is fusiform and its fur is brown on the back and flanks and white on the belly and throat. Males are slightly larger than females. | | LC | |
| Mustela putorius | European polecat | L: 30–42.5 cm; T: 10–19 cm; We: 650-1300 g. The polecat's body is elongated and flexible, with short legs, small, broad and flattened head and rounded, barely protruding ears. Its fur varies between gray, brown and yellowish on the back, being black on legs and belly; while the face is white with a dark mask. | | NT | |
| Martes martes | European pine marten NV: Martuju | L: 46.5–66 cm; T: 30 cm; We: 0.75-1.6 kg. Mustelid with small head, sharp muzzle, slender body and short legs. The fur is thick and soft, darker on the back than on the belly, with a cream collar. It differs from the beech marten (M. foina) in having larger ears, a sharper muzzle and a cream-colored throat instead of white. | | LC | |
| Martes foina | Beech marten NV: (in Spanish) rámila, rosmilla, rósmila, rezmila. | L: 38–53 cm; T: 17–29 cm; We: 0.9-2.5 kg. Similar to M. martes although slightly shorter and stouter, with a flatter muzzle and smaller ears. The white collar is forked towards the forelimbs. | | LC | |
| Meles meles | European badger, Eurasian badger NV: Tasugu | L: 58–75 cm; T: 11–20 cm; We: 4.8-9.3 kg. The badger's legs are short and strong, the muzzle is mobile and muscular and the neck is short and broad. The fur is long and strong, black and white on the back and black on the belly and legs. The head is white with two lateral black stripes covering the eyes. | | LC | |
| Lutra lutra | Eurasian otter NV: (in Spanish) lóndriga, lúndriga, londrigón, lundia, luntria, londre. | L: 59–75 cm; Lt: 95–124 cm; We: 4.4-9.4 kg. Short, brownish fur, with a white throat patch and membranes between the toes of the limbs. Its corpulence and swimming style distinguish it from other aquatic mustelids such as the mink. | | NT | |

Ursidae G. Fischer von Waldheim, 1817
| Species | Common and vernacular name (VN) | Description | Distribution | Status | Image |
|---|---|---|---|---|---|
| Ursus arctos | Cantabrian brown bear NV: (in Spanish) osu, usu (bear cub: escaño, escañón, osicaño). | L: 1.6-1.92 m; H: 90–100 cm. We: 75-250 (350) kg. Males are larger and heavier than females. The color varies from very dark brown to light golden through gray ranges. Adults may retain remnants of the whitish collar common in hatchlings. | | CR | |

Viverridae Gray, 1817
| Species | Common and vernacular name (VN) | Description | Distribution | Status | Image |
|---|---|---|---|---|---|
| Genetta genetta | Common genet NV: (in Spanish) gatu algar, xineta. | L: 43–55 cm; Lt: 78–104 cm; We: 1.5-2.2 kg. Introduced by the Arabs to hunt mice, the genet has a slender, mottled body, striped tail, black muzzle and pointed ears. It is an agile climber with nocturnal habits. | | LC | |

=== Artiodactyla order ===
The artiodactyla (Artiodactyla, from Greek άρτιος (ártios), "pair" and δάκτυλος (dáktylos), "finger") are an order of ungulate mammals whose limbs end in an even number of toes. The most developed toes are the third and fourth toes and, except for hypopotamids, which are the only ones that rest on the ground.

Bovidae Gray, 1821
| Species | Common and vernacular name (VN) | Description | Distribution | Status | Image |
|---|---|---|---|---|---|
| Rupicapra pyrenaica | Pyrenean chamois | L: 110–130 cm; H: 70–80 cm; We: 20–30 kg. Smaller and more slender than a goat, the Pyrenean chamois (R.p. parva) is characterized by its small hooked horns and the two dark stripes that cover the eyes like a mask. | | LC | |

Cervidae Goldfuss, 1820
| Species | Common and vernacular name (VN) | Description | Distribution | Status | Image |
|---|---|---|---|---|---|
| Capreolus capreolus | Roe deer | L: 95–145 cm; H: 54–83 cm; We: 16–30 kg. Males have small three-pronged horns that moult every year. Reddish-brown fur in summer, grayish in winter. The belly is lighter than the back. The hair of the young is reddish with white speckles. Bark-like cry. | | LC | |
| Cervus elaphus | Red deer NV: (in Spanish) venado,venau. | L: 160–220 cm; H: 90–120 cm; We: 50–160 kg. A large, brownish-colored deer with a whitish belly and buttocks. Females are smaller and antlerless. Males renew their antlers every year. The fawns are reddish, with white spots and stripes. | | LC | |

Suidae Gray, 1821
| Species | Common and vernacular name (VN) | Description | Distribution | Status | Image |
|---|---|---|---|---|---|
| Sus scrofa | Wild boar NV: (in Spanish) jabalín. | L: 118–148 cm; T: 17–24 cm; H: 71–85.5 cm; We: 40-118 (150) kg. An ancestor of the domestic pig, it has a large, elongated head, thick neck and short legs. The coat is harsh and varies in color from gray to dark black. The legs and the contour of the muzzle are blacker than the rest of the body. | | LC | |

== Bibliography ==
- García González, Francisco (2010). "Vocabulario". El Dialecto Cabuérnigo (in Spanish). Cantabria Tradicional, S.L. ISBN 978-84-96042-89-6.
- García Lomas, Adriano (1999). El lenguaje popular de la Cantabria Montañesa (in Spanish). Santander: Ediciones de librería Estvdio. ISBN 84-87934-76-5.
- Hernández Rodríguez, Alfredo; Samblás, Paco. "Recopilación de nombres vernáculos de mamíferos en España" (in Spanish). Archived from the original on 2010-08-14.
- Llano Merino, Manuel (1982). Mitos y leyendas de Cantabria (in Spanish) (1st ed.). Santander: Ed. Lázaro Sáinz. ISBN 84-300-6497-4.
- Palomo, L. Javier; Gisbert, Julio; Blanco, J. Carlos (2007). Atlas y libro rojo de los mamíferos terrestres de España (in Spanish). Madrid: Dirección General para la Biodiversidad-SECEM-SECEM.
- UICN. "Red List of Threatened Species".
