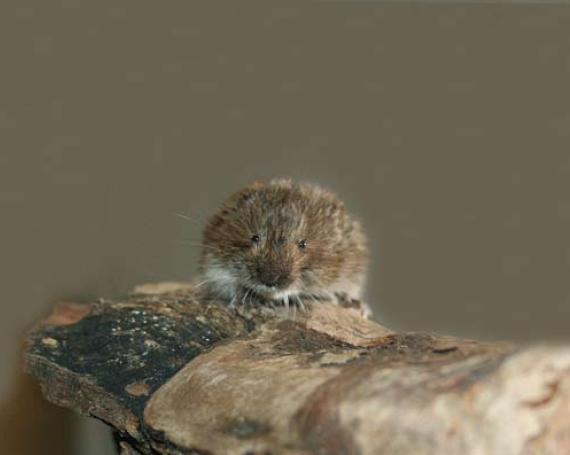

Conservation status
- Least Concern (IUCN 3.1)

Scientific classification
- Kingdom: Animalia
- Phylum: Chordata
- Class: Mammalia
- Order: Rodentia
- Family: Cricetidae
- Subfamily: Arvicolinae
- Genus: Microtus
- Subgenus: Terricola
- Species: M. tatricus

Binomial name
- Microtus tatricus (Kratochvíl, 1952)

Subspecies
- Microtus tatricus tatricus Microtus tatricus zykovi

= Tatra pine vole =

Species of rodent

The Tatra pine vole (Microtus tatricus), also called the Tatra vole or Tatra ground vole, is a species of vole endemic to the Carpathian mountain range in Slovakia, Poland, Ukraine and Romania. Two subspecies have been recognised. M. t. tatricus occupies the western part of the range in Slovakia and Poland, and M. t. zykovi is found in Ukraine and Romania.

== Habitat preferences ==
The Tatra vole lives at altitudes of 650 to 2350 m above sea level. The habitat occupied by the species is either humid rocky meadows in the subalpine zone or climax upper montane forest. Its distribution range is insular and fragmented as a consequence of landscape altitudinal structure and habitat heterogeneity. The population of the Tatra vole has been estimated to 200,000–250,000 individuals and no population fluctuation or population outbreaks were recorded.

== Evolutionary history ==
The reliable diagnostic character of M. tatricus is its karyotype. Its diploid number of chromosomes and the basic karyotype characteristics (2N = 32, NF = 46) are unique among voles of the genus Microtus. The species is genetically most closely related to alpine voles Microtus multiplex, Microtus liechtensteini and Microtus bavaricus. It split from the common ancestor as the first, and the oldest fossil found to date is from Holocene.

The species is listed as Lower Risk/Near Threatened in the IUCN Red List of Threatened Species and in Appendix II of the Bern Convention.
