= Wildlife of Azerbaijan =

The wildlife of Azerbaijan consists of its flora and fauna and their natural habitats.

The symbol of fauna in Azerbaijan is the Karabakh horse (Azeri: Qarabağ atı) which is a mountain-steppe racing and riding horse which can be found only in Azerbaijan. It is one of the oldest breeds, with ancestry dating to the ancient world. The horse was originally developed in the Karabakh region in the 5th century and is named after it.

The natural habitat of various types of animals in Azerbaijan is diverse. Some species only populate specific areas (lakes, parts of mountainous areas) while others are spread throughout the country. For example, passerines can be found throughout the whole of Azerbaijan. Protozoa parasites are also registered in all areas of the country, depending on natural habitat of carrier animals (cattle, poultry, etc.). Among mammals, gazelles populate the plains, Caucasian goat inhabits the major Caucasus areas, and most species of birds can be found in forests or water basins. Pest insects can be found in agricultural fields, while others populate defined biotopes only.

A number of natural preserves have been created and the hunting rules were brought into effect for protection of fur and hoofed animals in Azerbaijan.

== Fauna ==
Azerbaijan's animal kingdom owes its diversity to the variety of climates and biomes that can be found within Azerbaijani territory.

=== Mammals ===
Azerbaijan has the highest number of mammal species in Europe. Some 107 species of mammals have been recorded in Azerbaijan, three of which are unique to the country. Well-known species include Caucasian goats and west-Caucasus mouflons which inhabit Nakhichevan and western slopes of the Greater Caucasus in Balakan, Qabala, Zaqatala and Ismayilli regions. Jeyran gazelles are among the rarest and fastest species in the Caucasus. These species can only be found in Shirvan State Reserve, Bendovan and Korchay regions of Azerbaijan.

==== Insectivores ====
- Eastern European hedgehog, Erinaceus concolor
- Northern white-breasted hedgehog, Erinaceus roumanicos
- Long-eared hedgehog, Hemiechinus auritus
- Levantine mole, Talpa levantis
- Gueldenstaedt's shrew, Crocidura gueldenstaedti
- Bicolored shrew, Crocidura leucodon
- Transcaucasian water shrew, Neomys schelkovnikovi
- White-toothed pygmy shrew, Suncus etruscus
- Caspian shrew, Crocidura caspica

==== Bats ====
- European free-tailed bat, Tadarida teniotis
- Common pipistrelle, Pipistrellus pipistrellus
- Kuhl's pipistrelle, Pipistrellus kuhlii
- Lesser mouse-eared bat, Myotis blythii
- Whiskered bat, Myotis mystacinus
- Serotine bat, Eptesicus serotinus
- Lesser horseshoe bat, Rhinolophus hipposideros
- Greater horseshoe bat, Rhinolophus ferrumequinum
- Botta's serotine bat, Eptesicus bottae
- Mehely's horseshoe bat, Rhinolophus mehelyi
- Geoffroy's bat, Myotis emarginatus
- Brown long-eared bat, Plecotus auritus
- Noctule bat, Nyctalus noctula
- Savi's pipistrelle, Hypsugo savii
- Nathusius's pipistrelle, Pipistrellus nathusii
- Parti-coloured bat, Vespertilio murinus
- Bent-wing bat, Miniopterus schreibersii
- Mediterranean horseshoe bat, Rhinolophus euryale
- Blasius' horseshoe bat, Rhinolophus blasii
- Natterer's bat, Myotis nattereri
- Eastern barbastelle bat, Barbastella leucomelas
- Western barbastelle bat, Barbastella barbastellus
- Bechstein's bat, Myotis bechsteinii
- Grey long-eared bat, Plecotus austriacus
- Leisler's bat, Nyctalus leisleri
- Northern bat, Eptesicus nilssonii
- Soprano pipistrelle, Pipistrellus pygmaeus

==== Lagomorphs ====
- European hare, Lepus europaeus
- European rabbit, Oryctolagus cuniculus

==== Rodents ====
- House mouse, Mus musculus
- Brown rat, Rattus norvegicus (introduced)
- Pigmy field mouse, Apodemus uralensis
- Yellow-breasted mouse, Apodemus fulvipectus
- Grey hamster, Cricetulus migratorius
- Water vole, Arvicola terrestris
- Social vole, Microtus socialis
- Small five-toed jerboa, Allactaga elater
- Euphrates jerboa, Allactaga euphratica
- Libyan jird, Meriones libycus
- Tristram's jird, Meriones tristami
- Persian jird, Meriones persicus
- Vinogradov's jird, Meriones vinogradovi
- Midday gerbil, Meriones meridianus
- Turkish hamster, Mesocricetus brandti
- Azerbaijani mouse-like hamster, Calomyscus urartensis
- Transcaucasian mole vole, Ellobius lutescens
- House mouse, Mus abbotti
- Fat dormouse, Glis glis
- Forest dormouse, Dryomys nitedula
- Common vole, Microtus arvalis
- Snow vole, Chionomys nivalis
- Caucasian snow vole, Chionomys gud
- Robert's snow vole, Chionomys roberti
- Black Sea field mouse, Apodemus ponticus
- Striped field mouse, Apodemus agrarius
- Harvest mouse, Micromys minutus
- Schelkovnikov's pine vole, Microtus schelkovnikovi
- Caucasus field mouse, Apodemus hyrcanicus
- Daghestan pine vole, Microtus daghestanicus
- Major's pine vole, Microtus majori
- Nasarov's vole, Microtus nasarovi
- Persian squirrel, Sciurus anomalus
- Red squirrel, Sciurus vulgaris
- Indian porcupine, Hystrix leucura
- Roof rat, Rattus rattus
- Coypu, Myocastor coypus

==== Carnivores ====
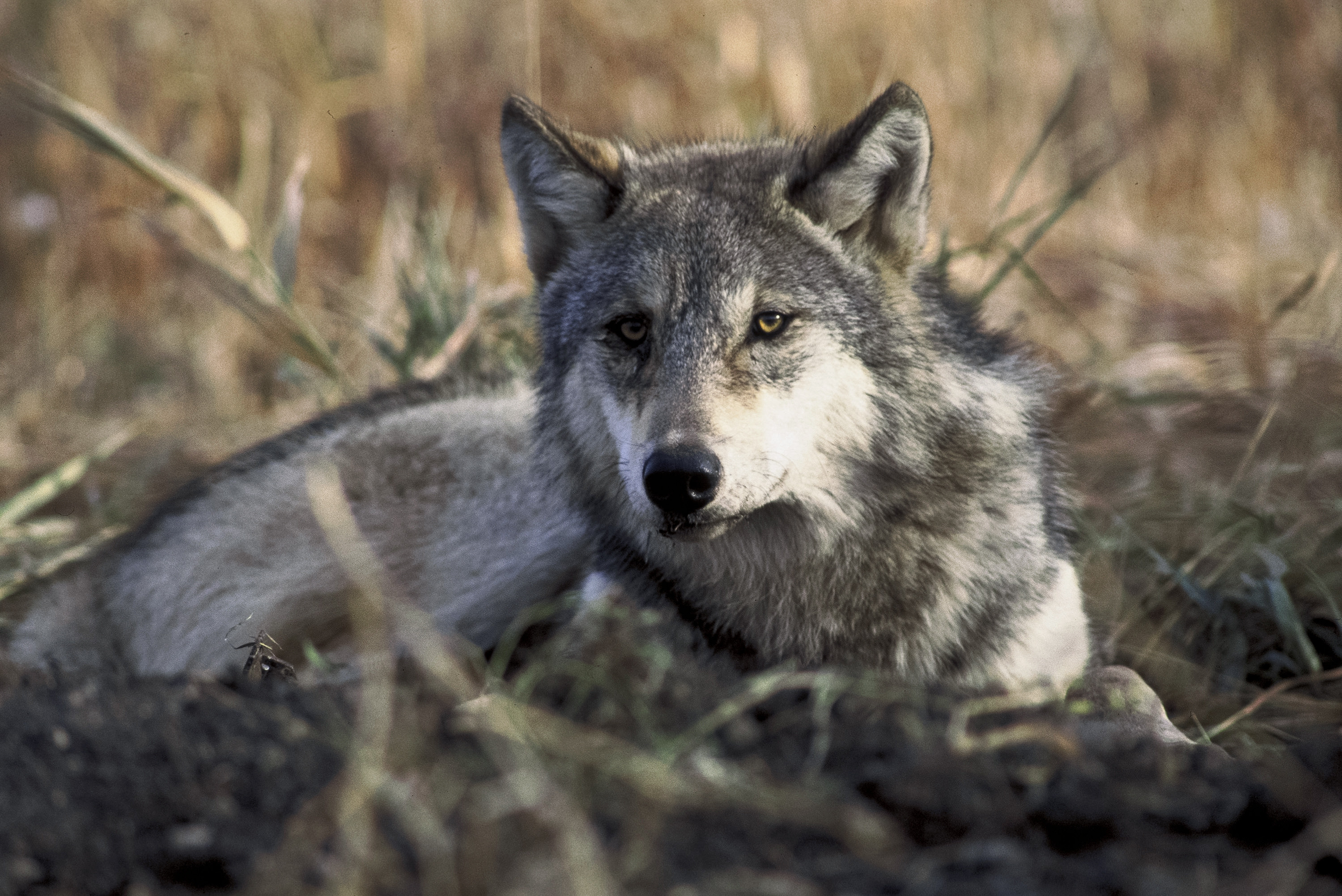
Grey wolf

- Grey wolf, Canis lupus
- Caspian Sea wolf, Canis lupus campestris
- Golden jackal, Canis aureus
- Red fox, Vulpes vulpes
- Beech marten, Martes foina
- Caucasian badger, Meles canescens
- Least weasel, Mustela nivalis
- European otter, Lutra lutra
- Eurasian lynx, Lynx lynx
- Brown bear, Ursus arctos
- Striped hyena, Hyaena hyaena
- Pine marten, Martes martes
- European wildcat, Felis silvestris
- Marbled polecat, Vormela peregusna
- Jungle cat, Felis chaus
- Persian leopard, Panthera pardus saxicolor
- Raccoon, Procyon lotor (introduced)

Extinct are:

- Asiatic cheetah since the 18th century
- Caspian tiger since the beginning of the 20th century
- Asiatic lion since the Middle Ages

==== Pinnipeds ====
- Caspian seal, Pusa caspica

==== Even-toed ungulates ====
- Wild boar, Sus scrofa
- Moose, Alces alces (extirpated)
- Roe deer, Capreolus capreolus
- Red deer, Cervus elaphus
- Goitered gazelle, Gazella subgutturosa
- Chamois, Rupicapra rupicapra
- Wild goat, Capra aegagrus
- Asiatic mouflon, Ovis orientalis
- East Caucasian tur, Capra cylindricornis
- Aurochs, Bos primigenius (extinct)
- European bison, Bison bonasus (extirpated)

=== Fish ===
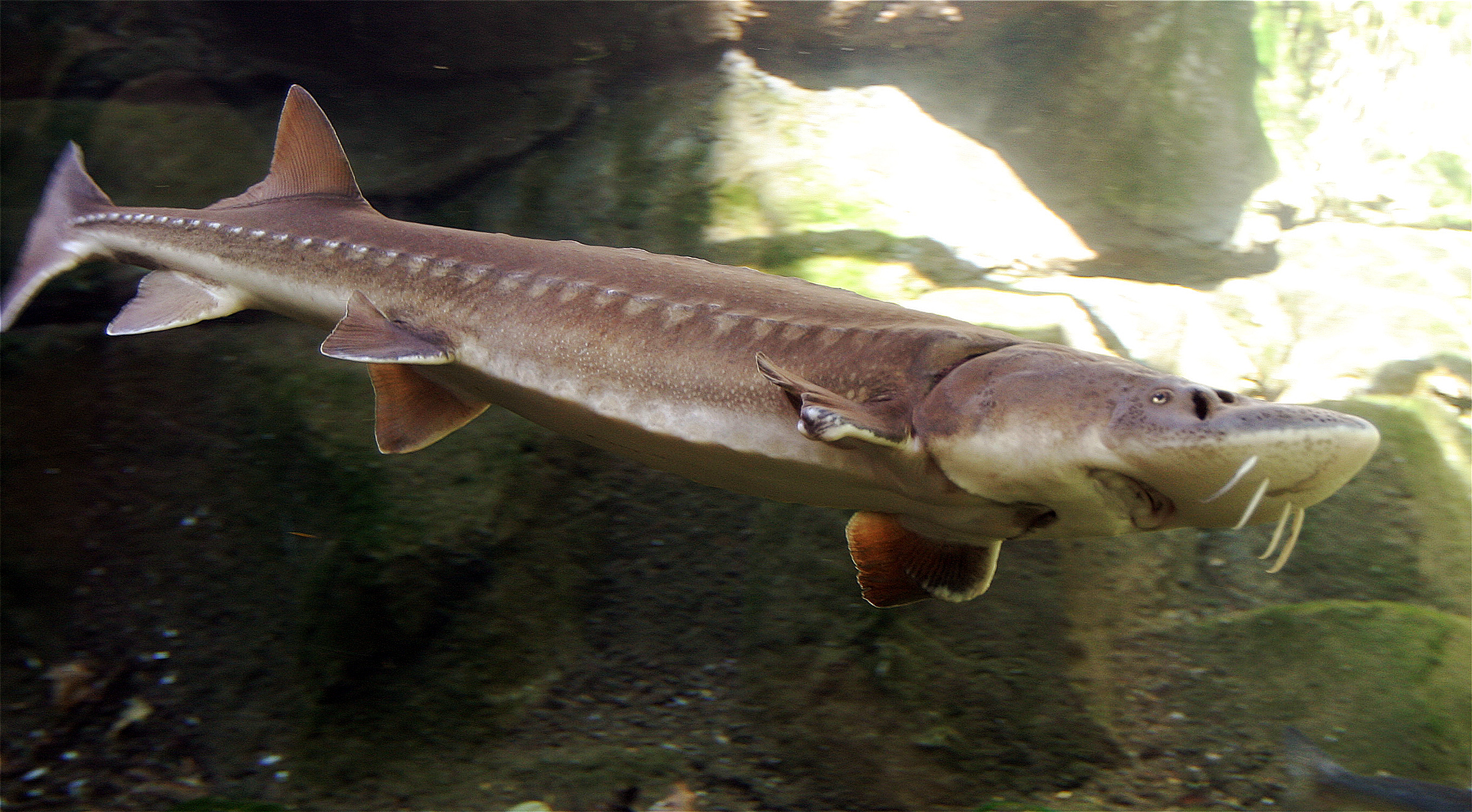
In the early history of Azerbaijan, sturgeon were mistaken for sea monsters.

The country's fresh water basins and the Caspian Sea account for 97 species of fish, eight of which were introduced and seven of these have become widespread. There are also over 15 thousand species of invertebrates in Azerbaijan. Most can be found in the Kur River, its surrounding lakes, as well as in the Mingechevir reservoir. Most of fish are anadromous or semi-anadromous (the young grow up in salt water and migrate to fresh water to breed after they reach maturity). The most valuable of the anadromous fish are salmon, sturgeon, stellate sturgeon and beluga. Aspius, Chalcalburnus and eel are also anadromous fish. Sturgeon meat and caviar are highly valuable. Furthermore, the water basins of Azerbaijan contain other valuable fish species such as bream, sazan, rutilus kutum and others. Herring can also be found in the Caspian sea, and is regularly fished. Due to the construction of a number of hydrotechnical plants on the Kur river after 1959, the regulation of the river water flow, as well as the Caspian water pollution led to the significant reduction in the number of valuable fish species. Three hatcheries (Kuragzi, Alibayramli and Kur experimental sturgeon hatchery) for melioration and fish-farming purposes were launched to restore the fish reserves and to increase the number of fish species. Azerbaijan's fish farming establishments and hatcheries account for breeding of 20 million sturgeons, 600 thousand salmons, over 800 thousand. A new hatchery with the capacity of 20 million sturgeons was put in commission in Khyly in 2000.

=== Birds ===
Azerbaijan has a rich avifauna. There are 363 species of birds recorded from about 60 families. Around 40% of the species are settled in Azerbaijan, 27% of these species winter in the country, and 10% pass through Azerbaijan during the migration period. One of the notable bird species is the golden eagle which inhabits mainly mountainous areas such as Nakhichevan. The golden eagle has been printed on dozens of stamps and cards in Azerbaijan.

=== Other ===
Ten species of amphibians from five families are recorded in Azerbaijan. There are 52 species of reptiles found in Azerbaijan. Most of these species are found in semi-desert areas in Shamakhi and Nakhichevan. Few are found in other lowlands or mountainous areas.

== Flora ==
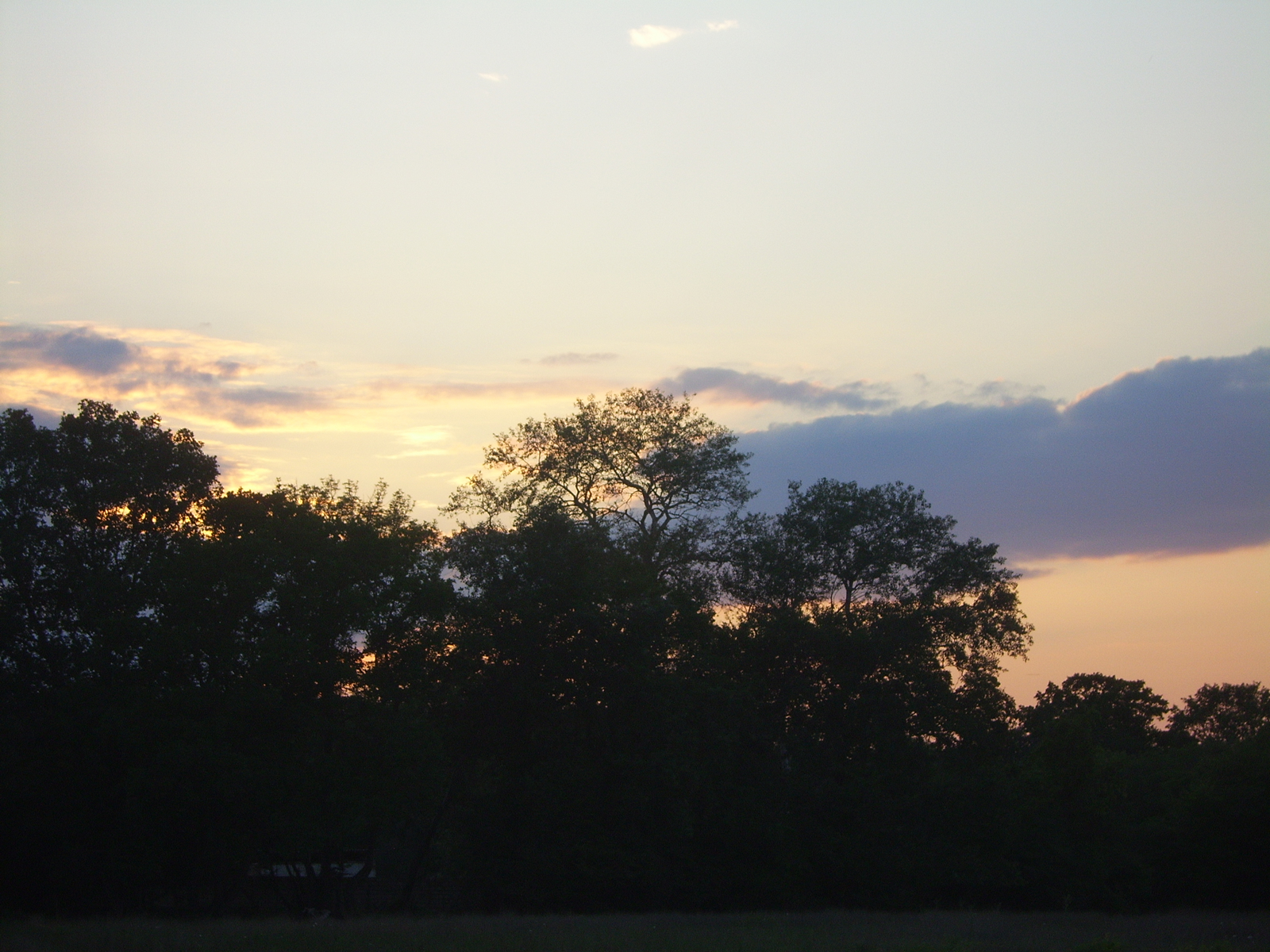
The Azeri Nabran Forest has some of the oldest trees in the world. The average age is 500 years.

Azerbaijan has a rich flora. Over 4,500 species of higher plants have been registered in the country. Due to the a variety of climates and biomes in Azerbaijan, the flora is more diverse than in other republics of the South Caucasus. Approximately 67% of the flora species found in the whole of Caucasus can be found in Azerbaijan.

The diversity of Azerbaijan's flora and vegetation is the result of the varied physical-geographic and natural-historic conditions, as well as Azerbaijan's history of being influenced by the remote floristic regions.

=== Trees and plants ===
In Azerbaijan forest cover is around 14.% of the total land area, equivalent to 1,131,770 hectares (ha) of forest in 2020, up from 944,740 hectares (ha) in 1990. In 2020, naturally regenerating forest covered 826,200 hectares (ha) and planted forest covered 305,570 hectares (ha). Of the naturally regenerating forest 0% was reported to be primary forest (consisting of native tree species with no clearly visible indications of human activity) and around 33% of the forest area was found within protected areas. For the year 2015, 100% of the forest area was reported to be under public ownership, 0% private ownership and 0% with ownership listed as other or unknown.

Relict genera of the tertiary period can be frequently found in all the zones of Azerbaijan, especially in Lenkeran (Talysh regions). They are the iron tree (Parrotia persica), the Lenkoran acacia (Albizia julibrissin), the basket oak (Quercus castaneifolia), the Caucasian persimmon (Diospyros lotus), the evergreen shrub of Ruscus hyrcana, the box tree (Buxus hyrcana), etc. There are 240 endemic species of plants in Azerbaijan.

90.5% of the Altyaghach National Park is covered by broad-leaved forests, the predominant types of tree are the iron tree, Caucasus hornbeam, oriental beech (Fagus orientalis), and birch.

== Reserves ==
Several reserves have been established in Azerbaijan in order to preserve fauna, flora and other ecosystems:

- Goy-Gol State Reserve
- Gyzylaghadj State Reserve
- Zagatala State Reserve
- Turyanchay State Reserve
- Pirgulu State Reserve
- Shirvan State Reserve
- Besitchay State Reserve
- Qarayazy State Reserve
- Ismayilly State Reserve
- Qaragol State Reserve
- Ilisu State Reserve
- Shahbuz State Reserve
- Eldar pine-tree State Reserve

== See also ==
- List of mammals of Azerbaijan
- Nature of Azerbaijan
- Karabakh
- National Parks of Azerbaijan
- State Reserves of Azerbaijan
