= Felten's vole =

Conservation status
- Least Concern (IUCN 3.1)

Scientific classification
- Kingdom: Animalia
- Phylum: Chordata
- Class: Mammalia
- Order: Rodentia
- Family: Cricetidae
- Subfamily: Arvicolinae
- Genus: Microtus
- Subgenus: Terricola
- Species: M. felteni

Binomial name
- Microtus felteni Malec & Storch, 1963

Species of rodent

Felten's vole (Microtus felteni), also known as the Balkan pine vole, is a species of rodent in the family Cricetidae. It was formerly considered a subspecies of Savi's pine vole. It is a small species, weighing 16–28 g and measuring 83–105 mm in length. It has a dark brown back and silvery-grey belly. The vole is found in southern Serbia, North Macedonia, Albania, and northern Greece, where it inhabits a variety of habitats at elevations of 20–2,050 m. It eats plant matter and seeds. It is listed as being of least concern on the IUCN Red List.

== Taxonomy ==
The species is named after Heinz Felten, a German zoologist who served as Curator of Mammals at the Senckenburg Museum in Frankfurt.

It was formerly considered a subspecies of Savi's pine vole. It is also called the Balkan pine vole.

== Description ==
Felten's vole is a small species, weighing 16–28 g and measuring 83–105 mm in length. It has a dark brown back and silvery-grey belly. It has a short tail and slightly high and conical upper incisors. Females have four nipples.

== Distribution and habitat ==
Felten's vole is endemic to the Balkans, where it is found in southern Serbia, North Macedonia, Albania, and northern Greece. It appears to tolerate a variety of habitats and is known to inhabit meadows, mountain forests, woodland edge, shrubs, riverbanks, and clearings. More rarely, it is also seen in farmland. It is known from elevations of 20 m to 2,050 m.

== Ecology ==
The species is nocturnal and semi-fossorial. It eats plant matter and seeds.

== Conservation ==
The vole is restricted to a relatively small area and is rare in its range, but is not thought to be declining in population or facing any major threats. Consequently, it is listed as being of least concern on the IUCN Red List. It has been recorded from protected areas.
