= Gerbe's vole =

Conservation status
- Least Concern (IUCN 3.1)

Scientific classification
- Kingdom: Animalia
- Phylum: Chordata
- Class: Mammalia
- Infraclass: Placentalia
- Order: Rodentia
- Family: Cricetidae
- Subfamily: Arvicolinae
- Genus: Microtus
- Subgenus: Terricola
- Species: M. pyrenaicus

Binomial name
- Microtus pyrenaicus (de Sélys-Longchamps, 1847)

Synonyms
- Arvicola pyrenaicus de Sélys-Longchamps, 1847; Arvicola gerbii Gerbe, 1879; Microtus gerbeii (Gerbe, 1879); Microtus gerbei (Gerbe, 1879) [orth. eror]

Species of rodent

Gerbe's vole or the Pyrenean pine vole (Microtus pyrenaicus) is a species of rodent in the family Cricetidae found in France, Andorra, and Spain.

== Taxonomy ==
Microtus pyrenaicus, commonly known as the Pyrenean pine vole, is a small rodent species belonging to the subfamily Arvicolinae. It was previously placed in the genus Pitymys, now considered a subgenus within Microtus. Due to its close resemblance, particularly externally, M. pyrenaicus can be challenging to distinguish from other Iberian voles such as Microtus duodecimcostatus and Microtus lusitanicus. Some authors classify these species within the subgenus Terricola.

== Description ==
The Pyrenean pine vole is a small arvicoline rodent, characterized by an elongated body and relatively short limbs and tail. It has a short, blunt snout, small eyes, and ears almost hidden in its dense fur, adaptations suited to its underground lifestyle. Adult body length ranges between 94.0 and 104.5 mm, tail length between 27.5 and 34.0 mm, and weight from 18.0 to 24.0 grams. Its fur is brownish, more reddish dorsally and greyer on the belly, with a distinctly bicoloured tail (dark above, pale below). The skull is small and delicate, lacking distinguishing systematic characteristics. Teeth are hypsodont with continuous growth, and the species displays the typical "pitymian triangle" pattern in molar structure. The dental formula is 1.0.0.3/1.0.0.3, and the diploid chromosome number is 54.

== Reproduction ==
Reproductive patterns are not well documented, but available data from the western Pyrenees (Navarre) indicate year-round reproductive activity in males, with peak activity in spring and minimal activity in winter. Female reproductive activity is distinctly seasonal, peaking from April to November and declining sharply from January to March. Litter size is small, typically comprising two to three young, with the smallest litter sizes occurring during the summer months. Food availability significantly influences reproductive behaviour.

== Habitat and distribution ==
This species has a relatively restricted distribution in non-Mediterranean climatic zones, primarily inhabiting the northern Iberian Peninsula and central to southwestern France. Within Spain, its range is limited to a narrow northwestern band extending from the eastern Pyrenees to Cantabria.

Microtus pyrenaicus occupies montane and subalpine environments, typically influenced by specific climatic rather than strictly altitudinal or latitudinal factors. The species rarely occurs in areas with annual temperatures exceeding 15-16°C or precipitation below 1,000 mm. Preferred habitats include forest clearings, edges adjoining subalpine meadows, riverbanks, and stone walls adjacent to grasslands. It occurs primarily at elevations between 800 and 2,000 metres, frequently found in areas dominated by black pine, birch, and beech forests.

== Population density and abundance ==
Population density data in Iberia is limited. In central France, densities can reach up to 100 individuals per hectare; however, Iberian populations are typically small, localized, and isolated, increasing in density from Mediterranean-influenced areas towards Eurosiberian regions. Sex ratios are usually balanced.

== Social structure and behaviour ==
Microtus pyrenaicus forms stable, small populations within its Iberian range, suggesting restricted movement. Unlike their French counterparts, Iberian individuals tend to display less subterranean behavior, being largely epigeal (surface-dwelling). Socially, they form small familial colonies, possibly employing a monogamous-facultative or polygynous mating system. Aggression is common between unrelated adult individuals. Spatial segregation through selective microhabitats, such as deeper soils with denser vegetation, is observed in regions where the species coexists with other voles like M. duodecimcostatus and M. lusitanicus.

Details on dietary habits are sparse, but the species is primarily herbivorous, consuming mostly leaves and stems of dicotyledonous plants.

== Predation ==
Common predators include small to medium-sized carnivores, particularly forest-dwelling species. In the southern part of its range, the barn owl (Tyto alba) frequently preys upon this vole.

== Interaction with humans ==
Despite occasionally high densities recorded in France, Microtus pyrenaicus is not considered an agricultural pest and generally has limited economic impact on human activities.
