= Terricola =

Terricola refers to two taxa of animals:

- Microtus (Terricola), a subgenus of voles
- Geoplanidae, a family of flatworms, formerly ranked as a suborder and called Terricola
