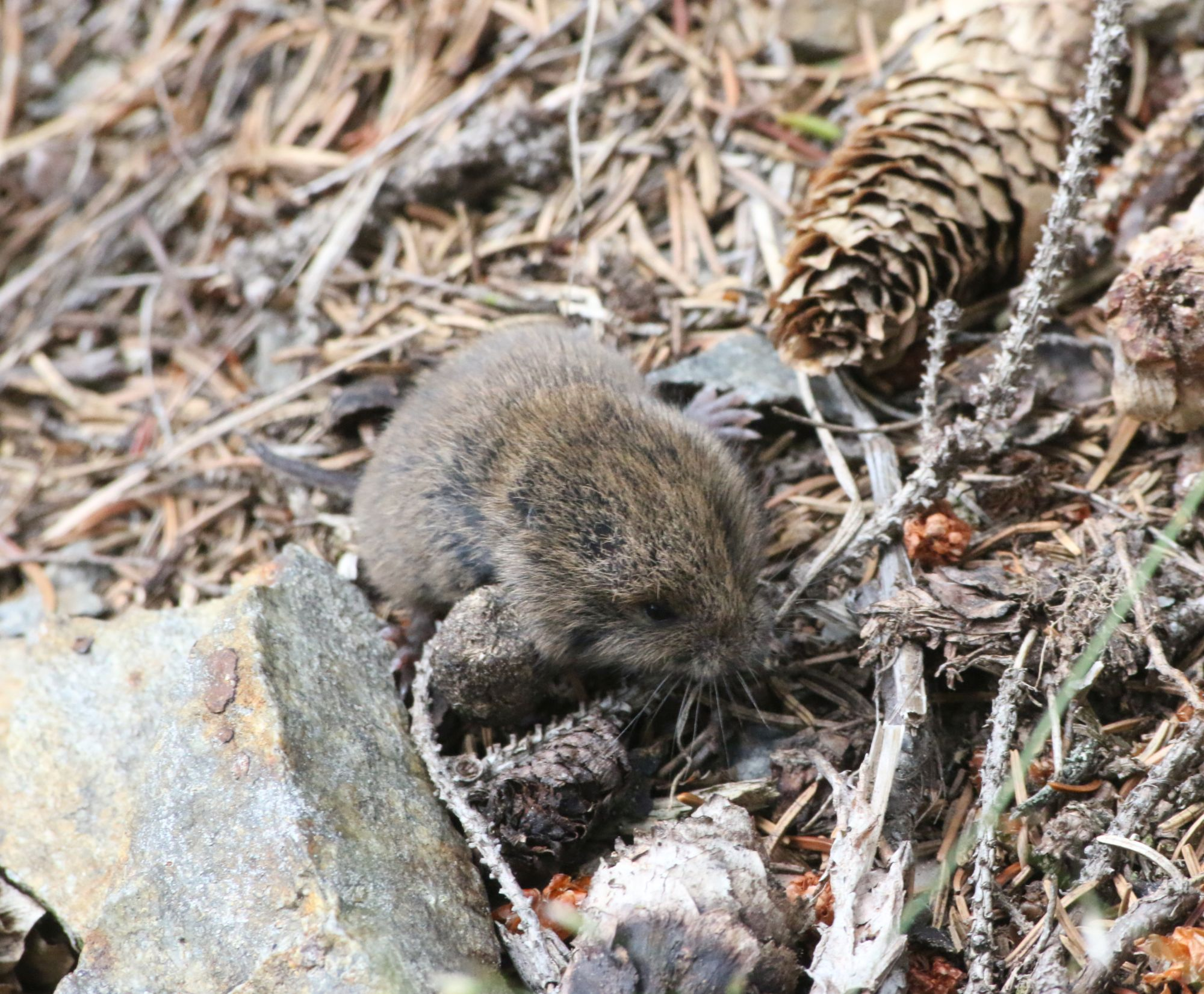

Conservation status
- Least Concern (IUCN 3.1)

Scientific classification
- Kingdom: Animalia
- Phylum: Chordata
- Class: Mammalia
- Order: Rodentia
- Family: Cricetidae
- Subfamily: Arvicolinae
- Genus: Microtus
- Subgenus: Terricola
- Species: M. subterraneus

Binomial name
- Microtus subterraneus (de Selys-Longchamps, 1836)
- Range of M. subterraneus (Compiled by: IUCN (International Union for Conservation of Nature) 2008) Resident

= European pine vole =

Species of rodent

The European pine vole (Microtus subterraneus), also known as the common pine vole, is a species of rodent in the family Cricetidae. It is native to much of Europe and parts of Asia.
