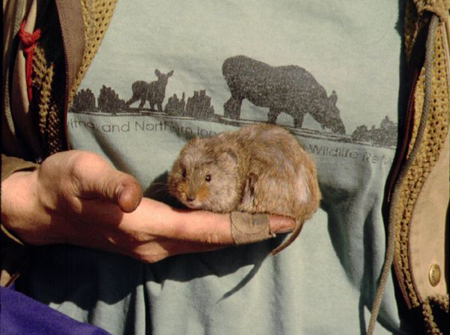

Conservation status
- Least Concern (IUCN 3.1)

Scientific classification
- Kingdom: Animalia
- Phylum: Chordata
- Class: Mammalia
- Order: Rodentia
- Family: Cricetidae
- Subfamily: Arvicolinae
- Genus: Microtus
- Subgenus: Mynomes
- Species: M. xanthognathus

Binomial name
- Microtus xanthognathus (Leach, 1815)

= Taiga vole =

Species of rodent

The taiga vole (Microtus xanthognathus) is a large vole found in northwestern North America, including Alaska and northwestern Canada. The name "taiga vole" comes from its living in the boreal taiga zone. It is also sometimes called the yellow-cheeked vole or chestnut-cheeked vole because of the rusty-yellow color on its face around its vibrissae (whiskers); The taiga voles derive their name from these features: "xantho" is Greek for yellow and "gnathus" is Greek for jaw. It is typically much larger than most other North American voles, especially those from the genus Microtus.

An adult taiga vole, excluding tail length, usually ranges from 186–226 mm (7.3–8.9 in) in length and usually weighs 140–170 g (4.9–6.0 oz).

This species is found in northern forests near water or bogs. It makes runways through the surface growth and burrows. It is usually found in colonies. It feeds on grasses, lichens, horsetails and berries. It stores food in its burrows for the winter. Like the singing vole, this animal may give a warning call to alert other members of the colony of danger.

The female vole has litters of 7 to 10 young. The vole population in a given area can vary greatly from year to year.

They are active year-round, usually during dark periods.

Although not commonly encountered, they can be locally abundant.

== Distribution and habitat ==
The taiga vole's habitat stretches from northwestern Canada to Alaska. Fossils have been found as far south as Arkansas, Tennessee and Virginia, suggesting that the taiga voles cover a much smaller range now than in the past. Taiga vole fossils have been found south of where the Laurentide Ice Sheet once was during the late Pleistocene. Fossil evidence suggests that they moved northwest after the Wisconsin glaciation event. The taiga voles are mostly found today in boreal forests and tundra, which provides good evidence as to why fossils have been found so far south. Fossil specimens have been dated back to just before or just after the glacial maximum, when scientist believe that areas of the southern United States would have been covered by the boreal forests and tundra that the taiga vole prefers for habitat.

== Reproduction and survival ==
The taiga voles live a polygynous lifestyle. Males are very territorial and defensive of resources. They typically mate during the North American summers, starting in early May and finishing around September. Each female will typically produce 2 litters per season but the second litter is usually smaller than the first. The taiga vole engages in communal winter nesting. A small group, usually 5-10 individuals, will share a nest during the winter. They will build very extensive burrows that occasionally will even go into the water where they can swim out. Taiga voles living in more dense populations typically have greater body mass than those living in less dense populations. They also exhibit the use of alarm calls, particularly during the mating seasons to warn potential mates of danger. The taiga vole cannot go more than 24 hours without eating or they can starve to death. They do not have complex metabolisms designed for fasting. They can consume all of their liver glycogen in 4 hours or less. They do not use torpor like many other small rodents do, so they must find other ways to slow the basal metabolic rate. They will lower their body temperature by about .5 degrees Celsius to reduce energy costs. The taiga voles, as do many other voles, rely on fat reserves for thermoregulation, using brown fat adipose tissue to increase their thermogenic capacity.
