= Thomas's pine vole =

Conservation status
- Least Concern (IUCN 3.1)

Scientific classification
- Kingdom: Animalia
- Phylum: Chordata
- Class: Mammalia
- Order: Rodentia
- Family: Cricetidae
- Subfamily: Arvicolinae
- Genus: Microtus
- Subgenus: Terricola
- Species: M. thomasi

Binomial name
- Microtus thomasi Barrett-Hamilton, 1903

Species of rodent

Thomas's pine vole (Microtus thomasi) is a species of rodent in the family Cricetidae. It is found in Bosnia and Herzegovina, Greece, Montenegro, and Albania.
