= Calabria pine vole =

Conservation status
- Least Concern (IUCN 3.1)

Scientific classification
- Kingdom: Animalia
- Phylum: Chordata
- Class: Mammalia
- Order: Rodentia
- Family: Cricetidae
- Subfamily: Arvicolinae
- Genus: Microtus
- Subgenus: Terricola
- Species: M. brachycercus

Binomial name
- Microtus brachycercus (Lehmann, 1961)

Species of rodent

The Calabria pine vole (Microtus brachycercus) is a rodent endemic to Italy.

== Taxonomy ==
Microtus brachycercus was initially described by Lehmann in 1961 as a subspecies of M. savii, under the name Pitymys savii brachycercus. brachycercus refers to its short tail. Genetic tests in the Calabrian region found, although similar, the X chromosome is larger than that of samples of M. savii found elsewhere in Italy and the Y chromosome is twice the size, leading Galleni in 1994 to designate M. brachycercus as a separate species.

DNA evidence suggests that M. brachycercus separated from M. savii 0.3 to 0.5 million years ago. The two species can hybridize, but the male offspring are infertile and do not produce and sperm. The females are fully fertile, however. This is an example of Haldane's Rule.

M. brachycercus has two subspecies, M. brachycercus niethammericus and M. brachycercus brachycercus.

== Description ==
The Calabria pine vole is a small vole, weighing about 14 grams (0.49 oz) to 24 grams (0.85 oz). It is very similar in form to Savi's pine vole (M. savii). It can often be distinguished morphologically by a more open anterior loop in the first lower molar, but this can sometimes be found in Savi's pine vole as well.

== Distribution and habitat ==
The Calabrian pine vole is found in central and southern Italy, in a wide variety of habitat types. It was first identified from Calabria, in southern Italy, and the extent of its northward range is still being investigated; earlier sources report the distribution as just southern Italy. It is quite common in its range and the population is stable, so it is considered a species of least concern by the IUCN despite its relatively restricted range.
