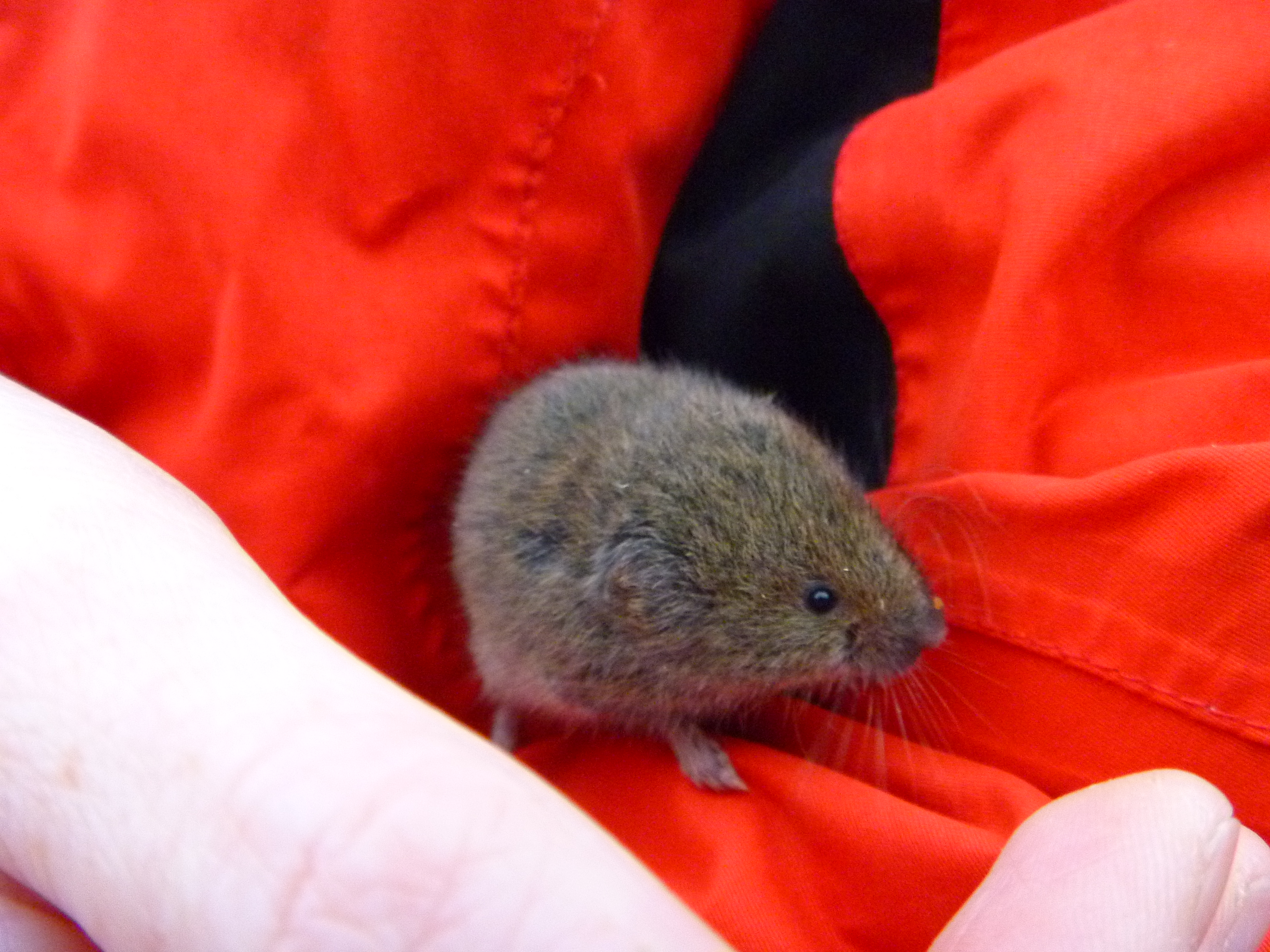

Conservation status
- Critically Endangered (IUCN 3.1)

Scientific classification
- Kingdom: Animalia
- Phylum: Chordata
- Class: Mammalia
- Order: Rodentia
- Family: Cricetidae
- Subfamily: Arvicolinae
- Genus: Microtus
- Subgenus: Terricola
- Species: M. bavaricus

Binomial name
- Microtus bavaricus (König, 1962)

= Bavarian pine vole =

Bavarian pine vole (Microtus bavaricus)

Species of rodent

The Bavarian pine vole (Microtus bavaricus) is a vole from the Austrian, Italian, and Bavarian Alps of Europe. It lives in moist meadows at elevations of 600 to 1,000 meters.

== During Ice Age ==
During the last Ice Age, it survived in three glacial refuges, including in the Northern Alps.

== Conservation ==
There are 23 museum specimens of this species; it was previously known to live in only one location, Garmisch-Partenkirchen in Bavaria, which was altered by the construction of a hospital in the 1980s. No specimens of this rodent were recorded after 1962 and it was thought to be extinct. However, a population apparently belonging to this species was discovered in 2000 in Northern Tyrol, just across the German-Austrian border.

A 2010 study found that it was discovered in Slavonia, Croatia, rather than its original habitat of Austria or Germany. Although it was difficult to analyze the exact cause due to the limited population, it was assumed that the habitat had changed due to competition with other species.

An Austrian scientist, Friederike Spitzenberger, stumbled upon the species in a live trap. Its species status was confirmed by genetic studies, and it was found to be very closely related to Liechtenstein's vole (Microtus liechtensteini) from the Eastern Alps. Further research is required to determine the size and range of the population and the species has been re-assessed as Critically Endangered by the IUCN.

As of July 2024, the Alpenzoo Innsbruck begun a breeding program at their "Center of Species Survival" with the intention to release Bavarian pine voles back into the wild and further study the species: the program has experienced "groundbreaking success."

== Genetic relationships with other subgenera ==
Genetic studies with other subgenera have shown that Microtus bavaricus does not have similar or closely related genetic sequence data compared to other subgenera. In particular, it formed a clear separate cluster from Microtus liechtensteini and did not appear to show a close relationship with Microtus tatricus.

== See also ==
- Lazarus taxon
