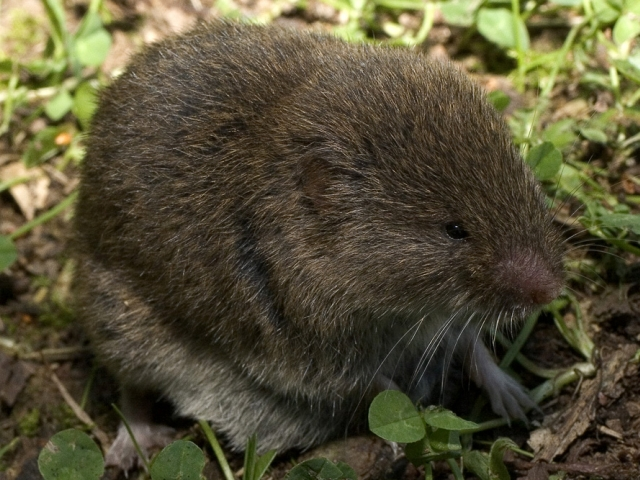
- Lusitanian pine vole

Scientific classification
- Kingdom: Animalia
- Phylum: Chordata
- Class: Mammalia
- Order: Rodentia
- Family: Cricetidae
- Subfamily: Arvicolinae
- Tribe: Microtini
- Genus: Microtus; Schrank, 1798

Type species
- Microtus terrestris Schrank, 1798 (= Mus arvalis Pallas, 1778)

Subgenera
- Blanfordimys; Euarvicola; Hyrcanicola; Microtus; Pedomys; Pitymys; Terricola †Tyrrhenicola

= Microtus =

Microtus Temporal range: Late Pliocene - recent

Genus of rodents

Microtus is a genus of voles found in North America, Europe and northern Asia. The genus name refers to the small ears of these animals. They are stout rodents with short ears, legs and tails. They eat green vegetation such as grasses and sedges in summer, and grains, seeds, root and bark at other times. The genus is also called "meadow voles".

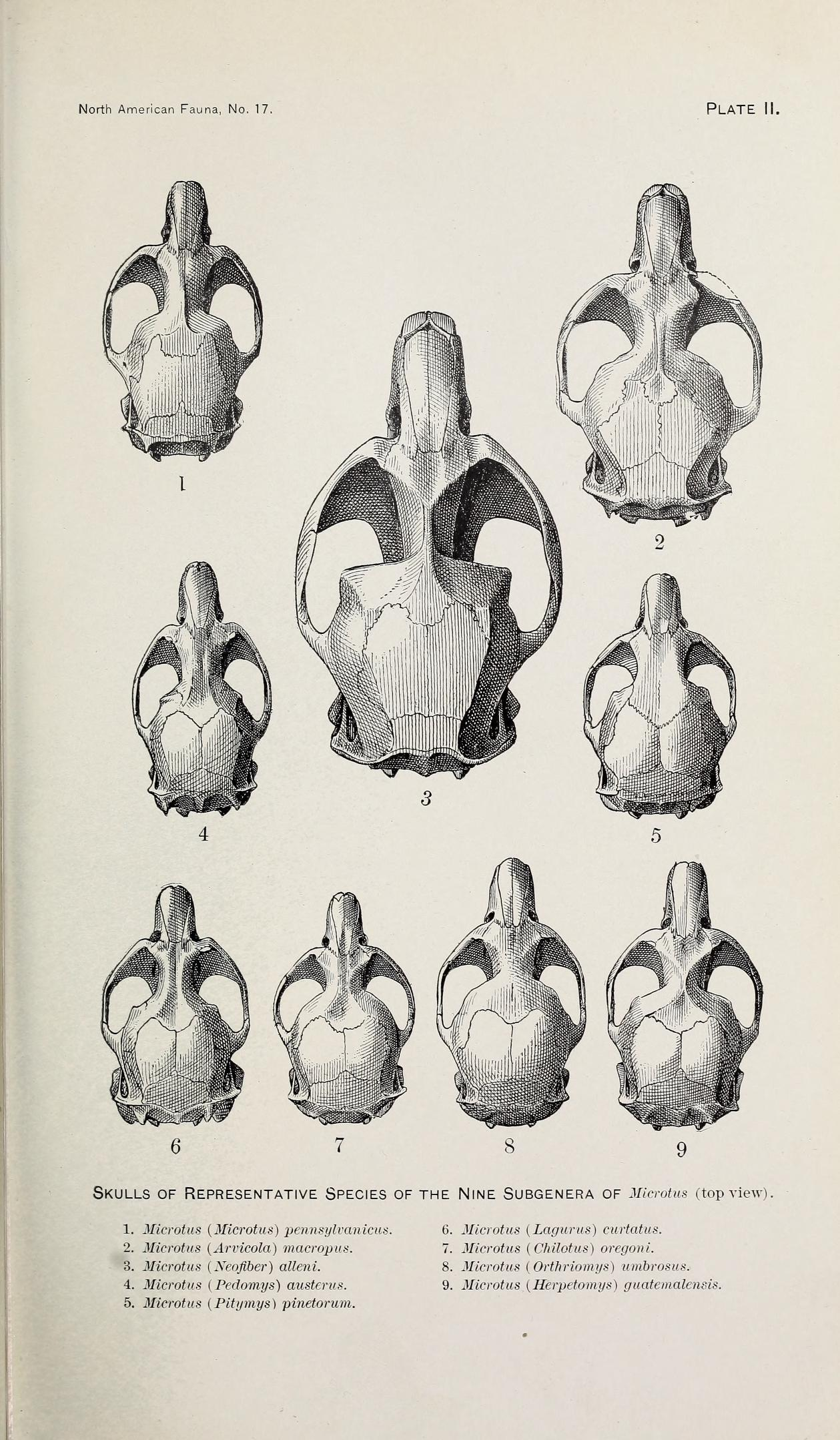
Microtus skulls (Bailey, 1900)

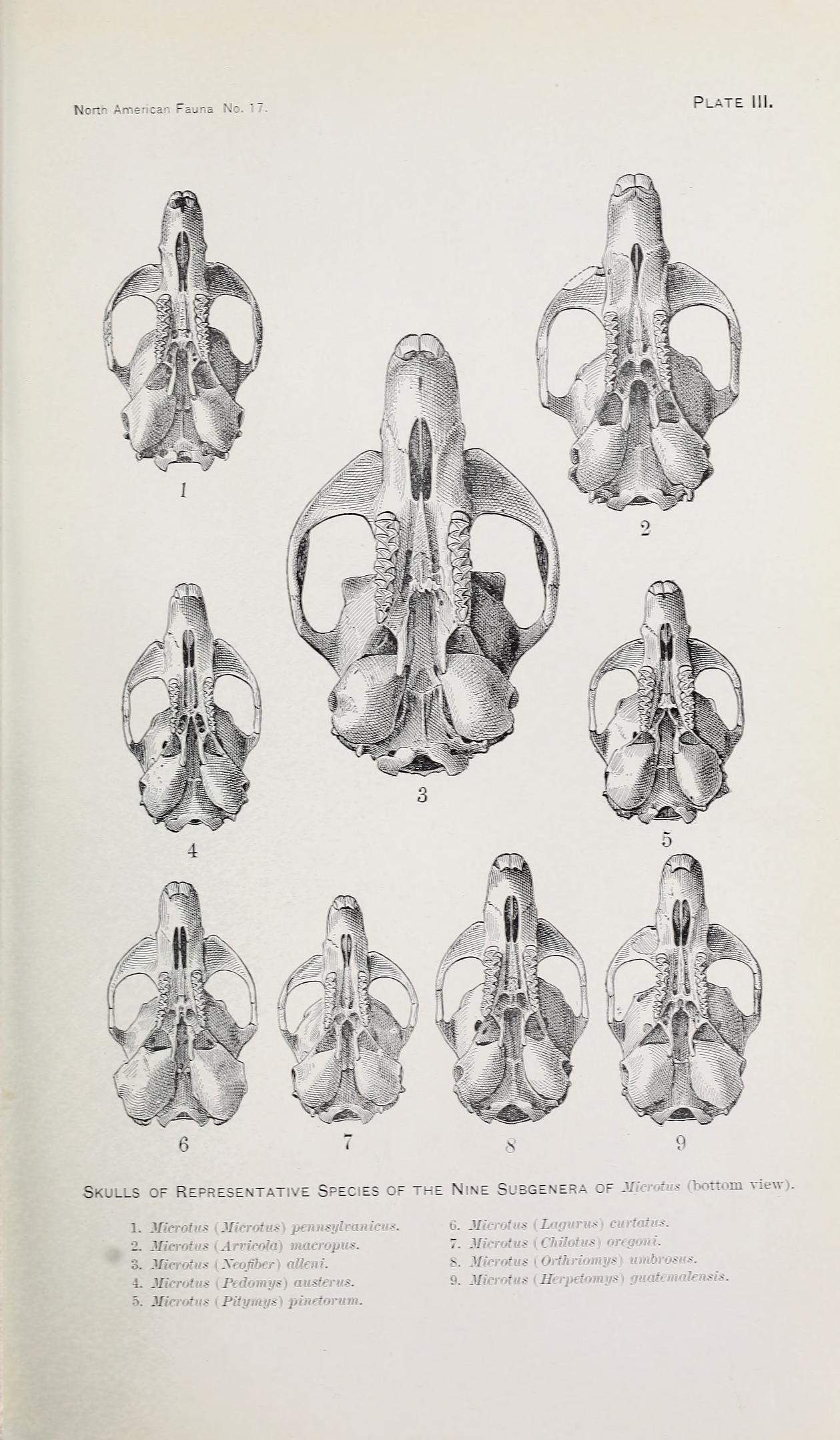
Microtus skull bases (Bailey, 1900)

There is some disagreement on the definitive list of species in this genus, and which subgenera are recognized. The American Society of Mammalogists recognizes the following 60 species, with discrepancies as noted:

Subgenus Blanfordimys

- Afghan vole (Microtus afghanus)
- Bucharian vole (Microtus bucharensis)
- Juniper vole (Microtus yuldaschi)

Subgenus Euarvicola

- Short-tailed field vole (Microtus agrestis)
- Mediterranean field vole (Microtus lavernedii) split from M. agrestis
- Portuguese field vole (Microtus rozianus) split from M. agrestis

Subgenus Hyrcanicola (not recognized by the ASM, listed in subgenus Microtus)

- Schelkovnikov's pine vole (M. schelkovnikovi)

Subgenus Iberomys

- Cabrera's vole (Microtus cabrerae)

Subgenus Microtus

- Anatolian vole (Microtus anatolicus)
- Common vole (Microtus arvalis)
- Doğramaci's vole (Microtus dogramacii)
- Günther's vole (Microtus guentheri)
- Harting's vole (Microtus hartingi) split from M. guentheri
- Tien Shan vole (Microtus ilaeus)
- Persian vole (Microtus irani)
- Kerman vole (Microtus kermanensis)
- Cyrenaica vole (Microtus mustersi) split from M. guentheri
- East European vole (Microtus mystacinus)
- Altai vole (Microtus obscurus) split from M. arvalis
- Paradox vole (Microtus paradoxus)
- East European gray vole (Microtus rossiaemeridionalis) split from M. mystacinus
- Schidlovsky's vole (Microtus schidlovskii)
- Social vole (Microtus socialis)
- Transcaspian vole (Microtus transcaspicus)

Subgenus Pedomys (not recognized by the ASM, listed in subgenus Pitymys)

- Prairie vole (M. ochrogaster)

Subgenus Pitymys (includes the former subgenus Mynomes)

- Insular vole (Microtus abbreviatus)
- California vole (Microtus californicus)
- Gray-tailed vole (Microtus canicaudus)
- Rock vole (Microtus chrotorrhinus)
- Western meadow vole (Microtus drummondi)
- Florida salt marsh vole (Microtus dukecampbelli)
- Guatemalan vole (Microtus guatemalensis)
- Long-tailed vole (Microtus longicaudus)
- Mexican vole (Microtus mexicanus)
- Mogollon vole (Microtus mogollonensis) split from M. mexicanus
- Montane vole (Microtus montanus)
- Tarabundí vole (Microtus oaxacensis)
- Creeping vole (Microtus oregoni)
- Eastern meadow vole (Microtus pennsylvanicus)
- Woodland vole (Microtus pinetorum)
- Jalapan pine vole (Microtus quasiater)
- North American water vole (Microtus richardsoni)
- Townsend's vole (Microtus townsendii)
- Zempoaltépec vole (Microtus umbrosus)
- Taiga vole (Microtus xanthognathus)

Subgenus Terricola

- Calabria pine vole (Microtus brachycercus)
- Daghestan pine vole (Microtus daghestanicus)
- Mediterranean pine vole (Microtus duodecimcostatus)
- Felten's vole (Microtus felteni)
- Anatolian pine vole (Microtus fingeri) split from M. subterraneus
- Liechtenstein's pine vole (Microtus liechtensteini)
- Lusitanian pine vole (Microtus lusitanicus)
- Major's pine vole (Microtus majori)
- Alpine pine vole (Microtus multiplex)
- Sicilian pine vole (Microtus nebrodensis) split from M. savii
- Gerbe's vole (Microtus gerbii or Microtus pyrenaicus)
- Savi's pine vole (Microtus savii)
- European pine vole (Microtus subterraneus)
- Tatra pine vole (Microtus tatricus)
- Thomas's pine vole (Microtus thomasi)

The IUCN recognizes these additional species:

- Bavarian pine vole (Microtus bavaricus) (included in M. multiplex by ASM)
- Singing vole (Microtus miurus) (IUCN lists this as split from M. gregalis, but the ASM lists M. miurus as a synonym of M. abbreviatus)
- Elbeyli vole (Microtus elbeyli) (IUCN list this as distinct from M. irani)
- Qazvin vole (Microtus qazvinensis) (IUCN list this as distinct from M. irani)

There is also at least one known subfossil species known:
Subgenus †Tyrrhenicola

- †Sardinian vole (M. henseli) extinct after 1300 BC
