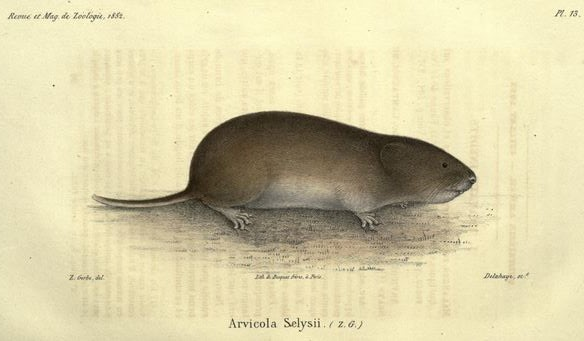

Conservation status
- Least Concern (IUCN 3.1)

Scientific classification
- Kingdom: Animalia
- Phylum: Chordata
- Class: Mammalia
- Order: Rodentia
- Family: Cricetidae
- Subfamily: Arvicolinae
- Genus: Microtus
- Subgenus: Terricola
- Species: M. savii

Binomial name
- Microtus savii (de Sélys-Longchamps, 1838)

= Savi's pine vole =

Species of rodent

Savi's pine vole (Microtus savii) is a species of rodent in the family Cricetidae, widespread across the Italian Peninsula with limited populations in southern France and southern Switzerland. This herbivorous mammal primarily inhabits agroecosystems, including rural areas, orchards, meadows, and agricultural fields, constructing complex burrow systems about 40–50 cm deep. Although its taxonomy remains debated, with proposed subspecies and recent genetic studies suggesting significant divergence between populations, it is recognized as a distinct species from the closely related Microtus brachycercus. Savi's pine vole is known for its ecological impact on agriculture, causing substantial damage to vegetable crops and fruit trees through root consumption and trunk debarking, while serving as a prey species for various predators including owls, kestrels, weasels, and foxes.

== Taxonomy and morphology ==
The taxonomy of Savi's pine vole remains debated. Several subspecies have been proposed, including M. s. savii in northern and central Italy, M. s. brachycercus in southern Italy, and M. s. nebrodensis in Sicily. Recent genetic studies suggest significant divergence between northern-central and southern populations, possibly indicating the early stages of speciation. Microtus brachycercus, initially considered a subspecies, has been validated as a distinct species based on genetic and karyological data. Genetic analyses indicate possible areas of sympatry or hybridisation zones between Microtus savii and Microtus brachycercus in central Italy, particularly around Umbria.

The morphology, particularly tooth patterns, varies geographically. Climatic factors appear to influence regional morphological differences, while local population isolation contributes to distinct morphotypes. Dental morphology, especially the anterior loop of the first lower molar (m1), is commonly used to distinguish Microtus savii from Microtus brachycercus. Typically, M. brachycercus shows a more open anterior loop compared to M. savii, although substantial morphological variability complicates identification based solely on dental features.

== Distribution and habitat ==
Savi's pine vole is widely distributed in Italy, with small populations in southern France and the southern Canton Ticino in Switzerland. In Italy, its distribution reaches altitudes up to 2,800 meters. It is common in rural areas, orchards, meadows, agricultural fields, and occasionally urban environments, preferring deep, moist, and well-drained soils. It avoids rocky and excessively dry terrains.

This vole constructs complex burrow systems approximately 40–50 cm deep, often repurposing mole tunnels. Their home range varies from 300 m^{2} for females to 450 m^{2} for males. Colony sizes can reach up to 15 closely related individuals sharing nests.

== Ecology ==
Savi's pine vole has a strictly herbivorous diet, predominantly consuming grasses, roots, and occasionally bark, particularly in winter when herbaceous vegetation is scarce. It has a polyphasic daily activity rhythm, alternating between short rest and activity periods throughout the day and night.

The main predators of Savi's pine vole include barn owls (Tyto alba), tawny owls (Strix aluco), kestrels (Falco tinnunculus), common buzzards (Buteo buteo), weasels (Mustela nivalis), and red foxes (Vulpes vulpes). Barn owls are especially significant predators, potentially providing biological control.

== Reproduction and population dynamics ==
The breeding season extends from March to November, with peaks in spring and summer. Females reach sexual maturity around 50 days and have a gestation period of 22–24 days. The average litter size is about 2.5 offspring, and females may produce multiple litters annually. Under favourable laboratory conditions, Savi's pine voles have demonstrated the potential to breed continuously throughout the year, though they typically reproduce more frequently during wetter periods such as spring and winter. Females can produce approximately 12 litters per year in optimal conditions. Young voles have high survival rates, with about 99% surviving their first 20 days and over 70% living up to around 240 days. Females generally have their first litter at about 73 days of age, and litter sizes range from one to four offspring. Although smaller litters typically result in heavier juveniles, litter size tends to decrease slightly after reaching a peak as parents age.

Population dynamics of Savi's pine vole differ from other Microtus species, as they do not show significant cyclical outbreaks. However, seasonal peaks in population density can occur, typically ranging from fewer than 50 individuals per hectare in summer to over 100 individuals per hectare in spring. The life-history traits of this species, including small litter sizes, delayed puberty, and relatively long gestation periods, characterise it as a more K-selected species compared to other voles, which typically exhibit rapid reproduction and large litter sizes.

== Impact on agriculture ==
Savi's pine vole causes substantial agricultural damage, especially to vegetable crops and fruit trees. Damage includes root and trunk debarking, tunneling damage, and severe attacks on horticultural species such as artichokes, lettuce, cabbage, onions, and orchard trees, notably apple and citrus trees. Population increases and damage are associated with modern agricultural practices, such as maintaining permanent grass cover and drip irrigation, which provide favourable conditions for voles year-round.

Control strategies traditionally included trapping and rodenticides, with chlorophacinone previously being widely used. However, the use of rodenticides is now strictly regulated, encouraging integrated management strategies combining habitat modification, trapping, and biological controls, such as promoting natural predators.
