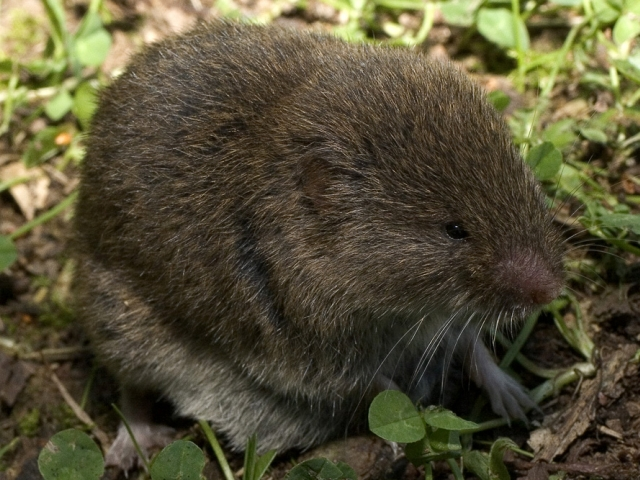

Conservation status
- Least Concern (IUCN 3.1)

Scientific classification
- Kingdom: Animalia
- Phylum: Chordata
- Class: Mammalia
- Order: Rodentia
- Family: Cricetidae
- Subfamily: Arvicolinae
- Genus: Microtus
- Subgenus: Terricola
- Species: M. lusitanicus

Binomial name
- Microtus lusitanicus (Gerbe, 1879)
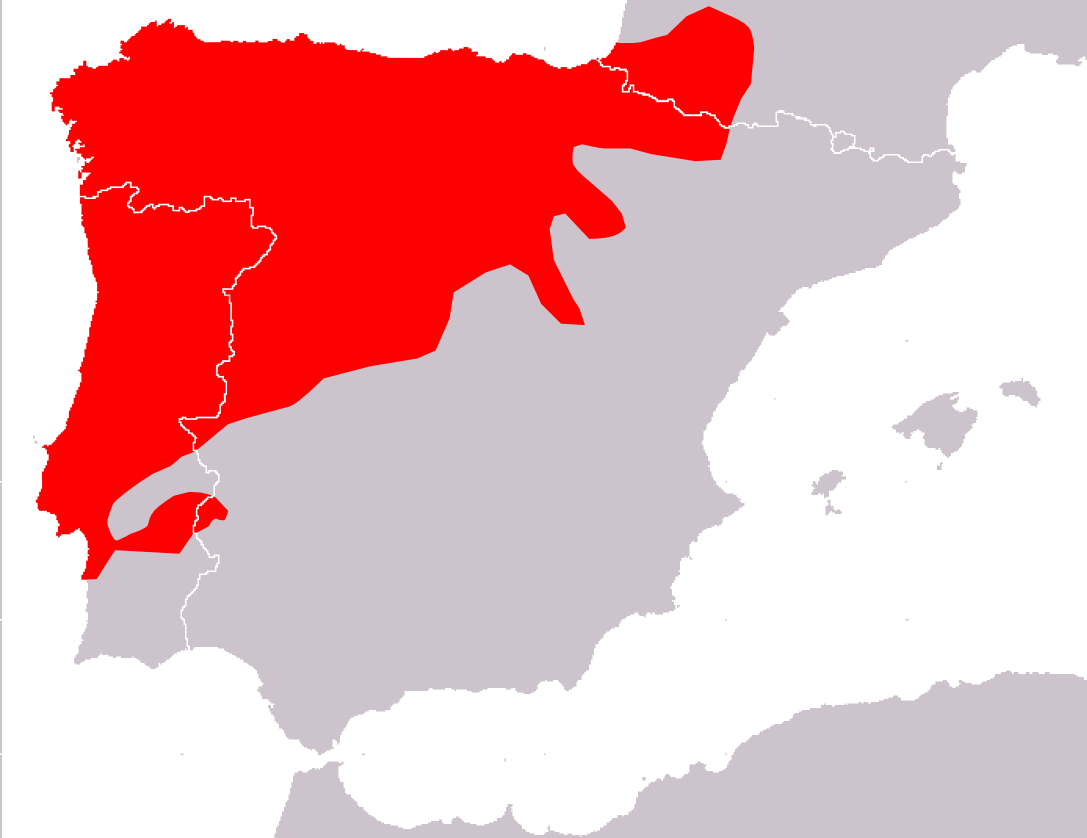

= Lusitanian pine vole =

Species of rodent

The Lusitanian pine vole (Microtus lusitanicus) is a species of burrowing rodent in the family Cricetidae, endemic to the northwestern part of the Iberian Peninsula, including northern and central Portugal, northwest Spain, and extending into the French Pyrenees. Its range spans from sea level to elevations of around 2,000 metres in regions characterized by cool climates, mountainous terrains, and fertile, easily excavated soils. This monogamous species occupies relatively large home ranges averaging 950 square metres, shows intra-sexual territoriality, and is active throughout both day and night in short bursts interspersed with rest periods. The vole breeds year-round with slightly reduced activity during winter, producing small litters of one to four offspring. Common in agricultural landscapes with significant habitat diversity, particularly traditional Mediterranean agriculture with small fields and abundant hedgerows, the Lusitanian pine vole is considered an agricultural pest in orchard areas where population densities typically range from 100 to 200 individuals per hectare, though no significant threats currently endanger the species as a whole.

== Reproductive biology ==
The Lusitanian pine vole breeds year-round, although breeding activity is slightly reduced during winter. This continuous reproductive cycle is facilitated by the generally mild winter temperatures and year-round availability of agricultural habitats and food resources. Mature males and females of this species are similar in size, indicating sexual monomorphism, with adult males averaging about 90 mm in length and 15.4 g in weight, and females slightly larger on average.

The mating system of the Lusitanian pine vole appears to be monogamous, suggested by the relatively small testis size of adult males and balanced sex ratios observed among both juvenile and mature individuals. However, whether this monogamy is obligate (necessary due to ecological constraints) or facultative (arising from social structure or environmental conditions) remains unclear.

Litters typically contain between one and four offspring, with an average of approximately two pups per litter. Litter size tends to be larger during spring compared to autumn, likely reflecting seasonal environmental influences. Additionally, litter size generally increases with maternal body mass, indicating older and larger females produce more offspring.

Due to its relatively small litter sizes and significant parental investment, the Lusitanian pine vole exemplifies a K-selected reproductive strategy, typical of species adapted to stable environments and consistent resource availability.

== Distribution ==
The Lusitanian pine vole is endemic to Europe, specifically found in central and northern Portugal, northwest Spain, and extending into the extreme southwest of France. Its range spans elevations from sea level up to 2,050 metres. The species is widespread and abundant, considered an agricultural pest in orchard areas within parts of its range, particularly in Spain, where population densities typically range from 100 to 200 individuals per hectare and can exceptionally exceed 300 individuals per hectare. Population densities remain relatively stable, without cyclic fluctuations. It occupies various habitat types, including natural habitats such as riverbanks, chestnut and oak woodlands, as well as agricultural environments like pastures, arable land, rice fields, and orchards. Lusitanian pine voles require soft, moist soils with dense vegetation cover for burrow construction and are frequently found near small stone walls. As of 2016, no significant threats endangered the species; local populations may decline due to pest control efforts.

Lusitanian pine voles occupy relatively large home ranges, averaging about 950 square metres. Estimates of home range size vary by method, with the minimum convex polygon method indicating ranges around 1,042 square metres for males and 862 square metres for females, while the kernel method suggests smaller areas around 229 and 159 square metres, respectively. Voles move an average of 73 metres per day, with reproductively inactive males typically moving greater distances, possibly due to mate searching.

== Social behaviour ==
This vole species appears to have monogamous pair bonds, with significant home range overlap between paired males and females. Intra-sexual territoriality is evident, with both males and females maintaining territories against same-sex individuals. Pair bonding and nest sharing are common, further supporting the monogamous social structure suggested by balanced sex ratios and the absence of sexual size differences.

== Habitat preferences and activity ==
Lusitanian pine voles prefer agricultural landscapes with significant habitat diversity, especially traditional Mediterranean agriculture characterised by small fields and abundant hedgerows. Verge—herbaceous field margins and hedgerows—are particularly favoured due to their dense vegetation, ample food, and protective cover from predators and agricultural disturbances. Vineyards are also commonly used habitats, while orchards, olive groves, and vegetable crops are less frequently utilised. Urban areas and pastures are typically avoided. This species typically inhabits areas with higher annual rainfall and frequent frost conditions, characterized by acidic soils, abundant Cambisol type soils, lower coverage of lithosol type soils, and the occasional presence of Solonchak soils. The Lusitanian pine vole tends to avoid grassland habitats, preferring regions with colder climates, mountainous terrains, and fertile, easily excavated soils.

Voles are active throughout both day and night, displaying short bursts of activity interspersed with rest periods, aligned with typical vole feeding rhythms. Activity levels differ based on sex and reproductive status, with males more active during daylight hours, and females increasing their movements primarily at night.

Ecologically, it shares its range in a fragmented, narrow sympatric zone in central Portugal with its sister species, the Mediterranean pine vole (Microtus duodecimcostatus), which occupies warmer, drier areas in the southern Iberian Peninsula with harder and shallower soils. These sympatric areas are patchily distributed, interspersed by a parapatric boundary where both species' distributions abut without significant overlap. The exact nature of the interaction between the two species in these contact zones remains poorly understood and may involve ecological competition or behavioural mechanisms facilitating coexistence.
