= Major's pine vole =

Conservation status
- Least Concern (IUCN 3.1)

Scientific classification
- Kingdom: Animalia
- Phylum: Chordata
- Class: Mammalia
- Order: Rodentia
- Family: Cricetidae
- Subfamily: Arvicolinae
- Genus: Microtus
- Subgenus: Terricola
- Species: M. majori

Binomial name
- Microtus majori (Thomas, 1906)

Species of rodent

Major's pine vole (Microtus majori) is a species of rodent in the family Cricetidae found in Caucasus region and its vicinities (Russia, Georgia, Azerbaijan, Armenia, Turkey, Iran).
