= Daghestan pine vole =

Conservation status
- Least Concern (IUCN 3.1)

Scientific classification
- Kingdom: Animalia
- Phylum: Chordata
- Class: Mammalia
- Order: Rodentia
- Family: Cricetidae
- Subfamily: Arvicolinae
- Genus: Microtus
- Subgenus: Terricola
- Species: M. daghestanicus

Binomial name
- Microtus daghestanicus (Shidlovsky, 1919)

Synonyms
- nasarovi (Schidlovsky, 1938)

Species of rodent

The Daghestan pine vole (Microtus daghestanicus) is a species of rodent in the family Cricetidae. It is found in Russia, Georgia, Armenia, and Azerbaijan.
