= Alpine pine vole =

Conservation status
- Least Concern (IUCN 3.1)

Scientific classification
- Kingdom: Animalia
- Phylum: Chordata
- Class: Mammalia
- Order: Rodentia
- Family: Cricetidae
- Subfamily: Arvicolinae
- Genus: Microtus
- Subgenus: Terricola
- Species: M. multiplex

Binomial name
- Microtus multiplex (Fatio, 1905)

Species of rodent

The alpine pine vole (Microtus multiplex) is a species of rodent in the family Cricetidae. It is found in Austria, France, Italy, Serbia, Montenegro, Bosnia and Herzegowina (Una National Park) and Switzerland.
