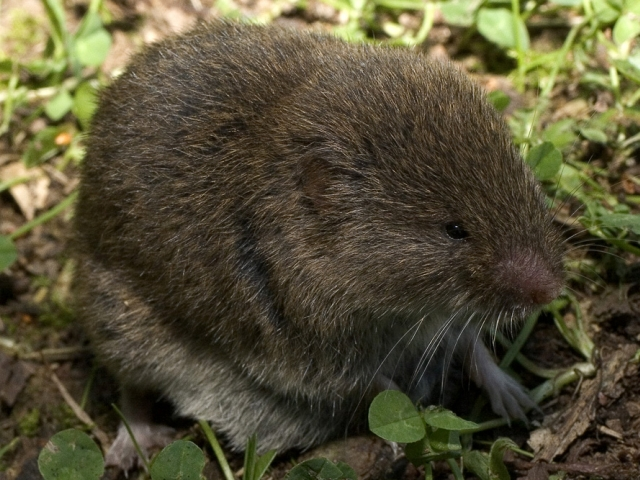
- Lusitanian pine vole, Microtus lusitanicus

Scientific classification
- Kingdom: Animalia
- Phylum: Chordata
- Class: Mammalia
- Order: Rodentia
- Family: Cricetidae
- Subfamily: Arvicolinae
- Genus: Microtus
- Subgenus: Terricola; Fatio, 1867

Species
- Microtus bavaricus Microtus brachycercus Microtus daghestanicus Microtus duodecimcostatus Microtus felteni Microtus gerbei Microtus liechtensteini Microtus lusitanicus Microtus majori Microtus multiplex Microtus savii Microtus tatricus Microtus subterraneus Microtus thomasi

= Microtus (Terricola) =

Subgenus of rodents

Terricola is a subgenus of voles in the genus Microtus. The authority for this taxon is Fatio in 1867. Earlier use of the name by John Fleming has no formal taxonomic standing. Species in this subgenus are:

- Bavarian pine vole (Microtus bavaricus)
- Calabria pine vole (Microtus brachycercus)
- Daghestan pine vole (Microtus daghestanicus)
- Mediterranean pine vole (Microtus duodecimcostatus)
- Felten's vole (Microtus felteni)
- Gerbe's vole (Microtus gerbei)
- Liechtenstein's pine vole (Microtus liechtensteini)
- Lusitanian pine vole (Microtus lusitanicus)
- Major's pine vole (Microtus majori)
- Alpine pine vole (Microtus multiplex)
- Savi's pine vole (Microtus savii)
- European pine vole (Microtus subterraneus)
- Tatra pine vole (Microtus tatricus)
- Thomas's pine vole (Microtus thomasi)
