= Mediterranean pine vole =

Conservation status
- Least Concern (IUCN 3.1)

Scientific classification
- Kingdom: Animalia
- Phylum: Chordata
- Class: Mammalia
- Order: Rodentia
- Family: Cricetidae
- Subfamily: Arvicolinae
- Genus: Microtus
- Subgenus: Terricola
- Species: M. duodecimcostatus

Binomial name
- Microtus duodecimcostatus (de Sélys-Longchamps, 1839)
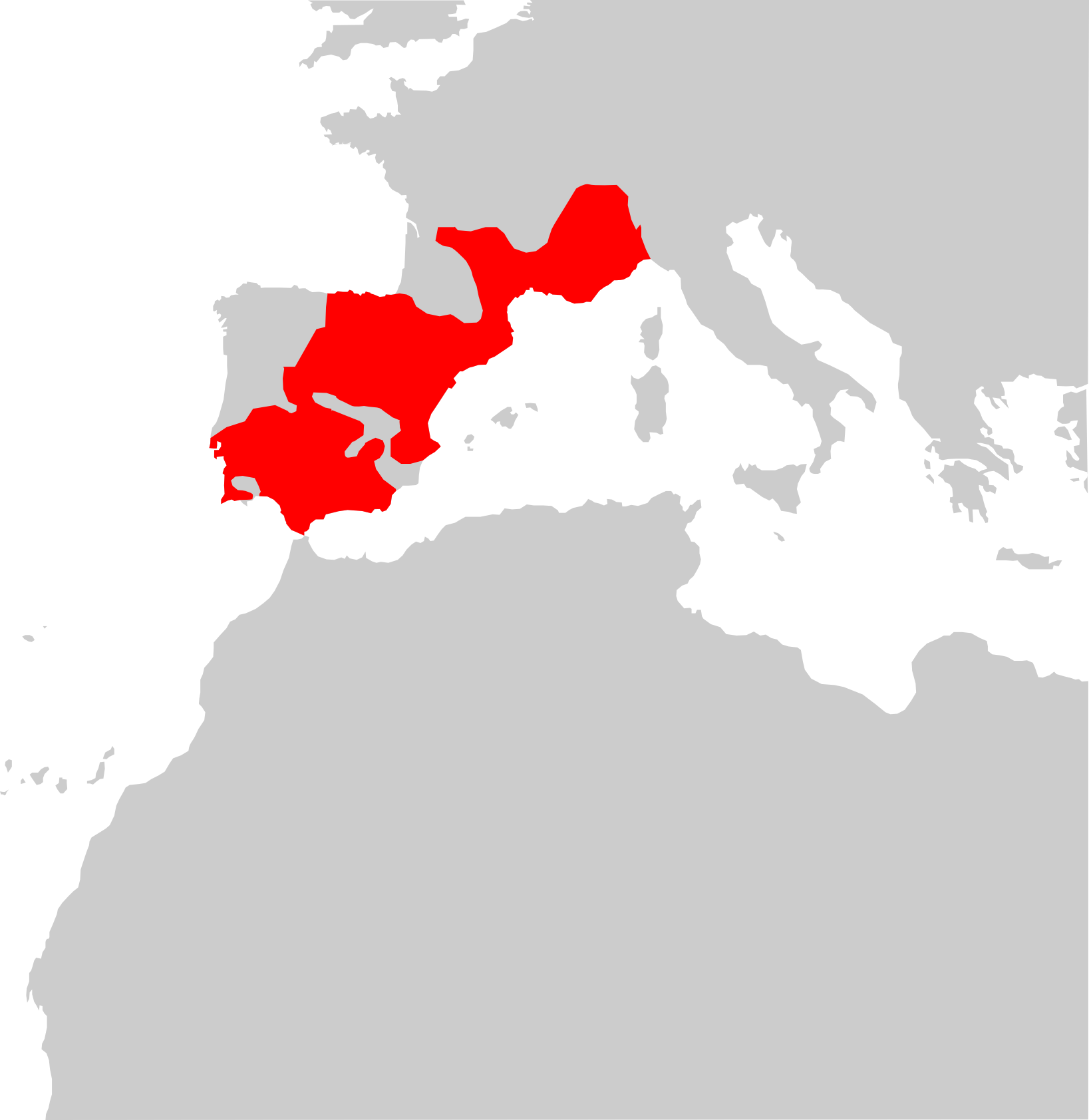

Species of rodent

The Mediterranean pine vole (Microtus duodecimcostatus) is a species of rodent in the family Cricetidae. It is found in France, Andorra, Portugal, and Spain where it lives in a network of shallow tunnels.

== Description ==
The Mediterranean pine vole has a head and body length of 3.5 to 4.25 inches (89 to 108 mm) and a short tail measuring 0.75 to 1.75 inches (19 to 44 mm). It weighs approximately 1 ounce (28 g). The head is broad, the ears small and the eyes medium-sized. The fur is soft and dense, the upperparts being yellowish grey-brown and the underparts somewhat paler. Young animals are rather more grey.

== Distribution and habitat ==
The Mediterranean pine vole is endemic to the greater Iberian Peninsula. Its range extends from southern France through Andorra, Portugal, and Spain, except for the northwestern corner of Spain, at altitudes of up to 2,250 metres (7,380 ft). It is widespread throughout its range and in some parts is common, with four hundred to six hundred animals per hectare having been recorded. It does not experience wide population swings as does the woodland vole (Microtus pinetorum). This species is mostly found in lowland areas where the soil is deep and light. It is found in clover-rich pasture, meadows, fallow land and orchards. In years in which it is plentiful it can be an agricultural pest.

== Behaviour ==
The Mediterranean pine vole is mainly diurnal. It makes an extensive network of shallow tunnels, throwing up small piles of earth as it excavates. It feeds on grasses, clover, alfalfa, roots and crop plants and it stores food in its burrow for the winter. Breeding seems to take place at any time of year. A chamber is prepared deep in the burrow system and lined with dried vegetation. In this a litter of up to eight young are born after a gestation period of about twenty days. Life expectancy is about two years with two males in a study being recaptured 33 months after their original capture. These are believed to be the longest individual lifespans of voles ever recorded.

== Status ==
In its Red Book of Endangered Species, the IUCN list the Mediterranean pine vole as being of "Least Concern". This is because it is a common species and the population is fairly stable. The main threat comes from the use by farmers of pest control measures which may cause severe setbacks to local populations.
