= Liechtenstein's pine vole =

Conservation status
- Least Concern (IUCN 3.1)

Scientific classification
- Kingdom: Animalia
- Phylum: Chordata
- Class: Mammalia
- Order: Rodentia
- Family: Cricetidae
- Subfamily: Arvicolinae
- Genus: Microtus
- Subgenus: Terricola
- Species: M. liechtensteini

Binomial name
- Microtus liechtensteini (Wettstein, 1927)

Species of rodent

Liechtenstein's pine vole (Microtus liechtensteini) is a species of rodent in the family Cricetidae. It is found in central and eastern Europe, from northern Italy through to Austria, Slovenia, Serbia and Croatia.
