= Lists of fauna of Europe =

This is a lists of fauna of Europe.

== By country or territory ==
=== Andorra ===
- List of ants of Andorra
- List of birds of Andorra
- List of mammals of Andorra

=== Austria ===
- List of birds of Austria
- List of mammals of Austria

=== Belarus ===
- List of birds of Belarus
- List of mammals of Belarus

=== Belgium ===
- List of birds of Belgium
- List of mammals of Belgium

=== Bosnia and Herzegovina ===
- List of birds of Bosnia and Herzegovina
- List of mammals of Bosnia and Herzegovina

=== Bulgaria ===
- List of amphibians of Bulgaria
- List of birds of Bulgaria
- List of Lepidoptera of Bulgaria
- List of mammals of Bulgaria
- List of non-marine molluscs of Bulgaria
- List of reptiles of Bulgaria

=== Croatia ===
- List of birds of Croatia
- List of mammals of Croatia

=== Cyprus ===
- List of amphibians of Cyprus
- List of birds of Cyprus
- List of mammals of Cyprus
- List of reptiles of Cyprus

=== Czech Republic ===
- List of birds of the Czech Republic
- List of herpetofauna of the Czech Republic
- List of leeches of the Czech Republic
- List of Lepidoptera of the Czech Republic
- List of mammals of the Czech Republic
- List of non-marine molluscs of the Czech Republic

=== Denmark ===
- List of amphibians and reptiles of Denmark
- List of birds of Denmark
- List of mammals of Denmark
- List of fishes of Denmark

=== Estonia ===
- List of birds of Estonia
- List of butterflies of Estonia
- List of fishes of Estonia
- List of mammals of Estonia
- List of moths of Estonia
- List of Odonata of Estonia

=== Finland ===
- List of birds of Finland
- List of mammals of Finland
- List of reptiles of Finland

=== France ===
- List of amphibians of Metropolitan France
- List of birds of Metropolitan France
- List of insects of Metropolitan France
- List of mammals of Metropolitan France
- List of non-marine molluscs of Metropolitan France
- List of reptiles of Metropolitan France

=== Georgia ===
- List of birds of Georgia
- List of mammals of Georgia
- List of non-marine molluscs of Georgia

=== Germany ===
- List of birds of Germany
- List of fish in Germany
- List of mammals of Germany

=== Great Britain ===
- List of amphibians of Great Britain
- List of birds of Great Britain
- List of fishes of Great Britain
- List of freshwater leeches of Great Britain
- Lists of insects of Great Britain
- List of mammals of Great Britain
- List of non-marine molluscs of Great Britain
- List of reptiles of Great Britain

=== Greece ===
- List of amphibians of Greece
- List of birds of Greece
- List of freshwater fishes of Greece
- List of Lepidoptera of Greece
- List of mammals of Greece
- List of non-marine molluscs of Greece
- List of reptiles of Greece

=== Hungary ===
- List of birds of Hungary
- List of domesticated animals from Hungary
- List of mammals of Hungary

=== Iceland ===
- List of birds of Iceland
- List of freshwater fishes of Iceland
- List of Lepidoptera of Iceland
- List of mammals of Iceland

=== Ireland ===
- List of amphibians of Ireland
- List of birds of Ireland
- List of butterflies in Ireland
- List of Diptera of Ireland
- List of fish of Ireland
- List of mammals in Ireland
- List of marine molluscs of Ireland
- List of moths of Ireland
- List of Nemertea of Ireland
- List of non-marine molluscs of Ireland
- List of Nudibranchia of Ireland
- List of Odonata species of Ireland
- List of reptiles of Ireland

=== Isle of Man ===
- List of birds of the Isle of Man

=== Italy ===
- List of amphibians of Italy
- List of birds of Italy
- List of butterflies of Italy
- List of extinct and endangered species of Italy
- List of mammals of Italy
- List of moths of Italy
- List of non-marine molluscs of Italy
- List of reptiles of Italy
- List of snakes of Italy

=== Kazakhstan ===
- List of birds of Kazakhstan
- List of mammals of Kazakhstan
- List of reptiles of Kazakhstan

=== Latvia ===
- List of birds of Latvia
- List of mammals of Latvia

=== Liechtenstein ===
- List of birds of Liechtenstein
- List of mammals of Liechtenstein

=== Lithuania ===
- List of birds of Lithuania
- List of mammals of Lithuania

=== Luxembourg ===
- List of birds of Luxembourg
- List of Lepidoptera of Luxembourg
- List of mammals of Luxembourg

=== Malta ===
- List of amphibians of Malta
- List of birds of Malta
- List of mammals of Malta
- List of reptiles of Malta

=== Moldova ===
- List of birds of Moldova
- List of mammals of Moldova

=== Monaco ===
- List of birds of Monaco
- List of mammals of Monaco

=== Montenegro ===
- List of endemic species of Montenegro

=== Netherlands ===
- List of birds of the Netherlands
- List of mammals of the Netherlands

=== North Macedonia ===
- List of snakes in North Macedonia

=== Norway ===
- List of amphibians and reptiles of Norway
- List of birds of Norway
- List of Lepidoptera of Norway
- List of mammals of Norway
- List of Norwegian cattle breeds

=== Poland ===
- List of birds of Poland
- List of Lepidoptera of Poland
- List of mammals of Poland
- List of non-marine molluscs of Poland
- List of reptiles of Poland

=== Portugal ===
- List of birds of Portugal
- List of mammals of Portugal

=== Romania ===
- List of birds of Romania
- List of mammals of Romania

=== San Marino ===
- List of birds of San Marino
- List of mammals of San Marino

=== Serbia ===
- List of birds of Serbia
- List of mammals of Serbia

=== Slovakia ===
- List of birds of Slovakia
- List of Lepidoptera of Slovakia
- List of mammals of Slovakia
- List of non-marine molluscs of Slovakia

=== Slovenia ===
- List of birds of Slovenia
- List of Lepidoptera of Slovenia
- List of mammals of Slovenia
- List of Odonata species of Slovenia

=== Spain ===
- List of birds of Spain
- List of mammals of Spain

=== Sweden ===
- List of amphibians and reptiles of Sweden
- List of birds of Sweden
- List of mammals of Sweden

=== Switzerland ===
- List of birds of Switzerland
- List of mammals of Switzerland

=== Turkey ===
- List of birds of Turkey
- List of butterflies of Turkey
- List of mammals of Turkey
- List of moths of Turkey
  - List of moths of Turkey (Coleophoridae)
  - List of moths of Turkey (Noctuidae)
- List of non-marine molluscs of Turkey
- List of reptiles of Turkey

=== Ukraine ===
- List of birds of Ukraine
- List of fish in Ukraine
- List of Lepidoptera of Ukraine
- List of mammals of Ukraine
- List of non-marine molluscs of Ukraine
