= List of mammals of Liechtenstein =

This is a list of the mammal species recorded in Liechtenstein. There are forty mammal species in Liechtenstein, of which two are vulnerable and two are near threatened.

Icons which state each species' global IUCN status:
| CR | Critically Endangered | In imminent risk of extinction in the wild |
| EN | Endangered | Facing an extremely high risk of extinction in the wild |
| VU | Vulnerable | Facing a high risk of extinction in the wild |
| NT | Near Threatened | Doesn't meet any criteria that would categorise it as risking extinction but likely to in the future |
| LC | Least Concern | No current identifiable risks to this species |

== Order: Rodentia (rodents) ==
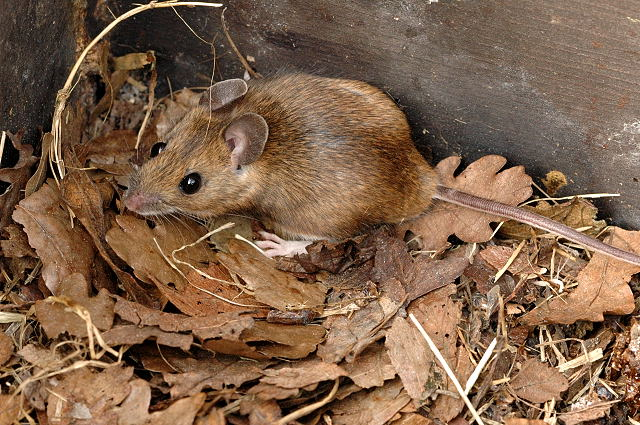
Yellow-necked mouse

Rodents make up the largest order of mammals, with over 40% of mammalian species. They have two incisors in the upper and lower jaw which grow continually and must be kept short by gnawing.

- Suborder: Sciurognathi
  - Family: Castoridae (beavers)
    - Genus: Castor
      - Eurasian beaver, C. fiber LC
  - Family: Gliridae (dormice)
    - Subfamily: Leithiinae
      - Genus: Dryomys
        - Forest dormouse, Dryomys nitedula LC
  - Family: Cricetidae
    - Subfamily: Arvicolinae
      - Genus: Arvicola
        - Water vole, Arvicola terrestris LC
      - Genus: Clethrionomys
        - Bank vole, Clethrionomys glareolus LC
      - Genus: Microtus
        - Field vole, Microtus agrestis LC
        - European pine vole, Microtus subterraneus LC
  - Family: Muridae (mice, rats, voles, gerbils, hamsters)
    - Subfamily: Murinae
      - Genus: Apodemus
        - Yellow-necked mouse, A. flavicollis LC
        - Wood mouse, A. sylvaticus LC
        - Ural field mouse, A. uralensis LC
  - Family: Sciuridae (squirrels)
    - Genus: Marmota
      - Alpine marmot, M. marmota LC

== Order: Lagomorpha (lagomorphs) ==
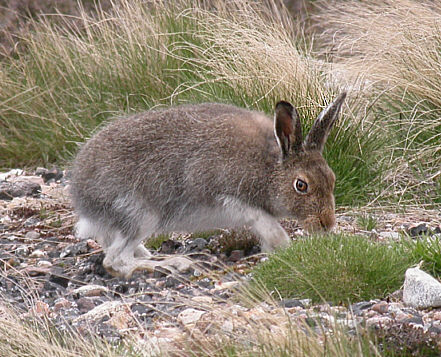
Mountain hare

The lagomorphs comprise two families, Leporidae (hares and rabbits), and Ochotonidae (pikas). Though they can resemble rodents, and were classified as a superfamily in that order until the early twentieth century, they have since been considered a separate order. They differ from rodents in a number of physical characteristics, such as having four incisors in the upper jaw rather than two.

- Family: Leporidae (rabbits, hares)
  - Genus: Lepus
    - European hare, L. europaeus LC
    - Mountain hare, L. timidus LC

== Order: Eulipotyphla (hedgehogs, shrews and moles) ==
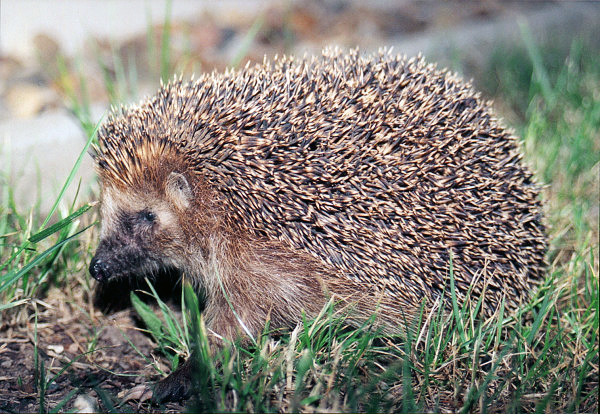
West European hedgehog

Hedgehogs are easily recognised by their spines, shrews closely resemble mice, and moles are stout-bodied burrowers.

- Family: Erinaceidae (hedgehogs)
  - Subfamily: Erinaceinae
    - Genus: Erinaceus
      - West European hedgehog, E. europaeus NT
- Family: Soricidae (shrews)
  - Subfamily: Crocidurinae
    - Genus: Crocidura
      - Bicolored shrew, Crocidura leucodon LC
      - Greater white-toothed shrew, Crocidura russula LC
      - Lesser white-toothed shrew, C. suaveolens LC
  - Subfamily: Soricinae
    - Tribe: Nectogalini
      - Genus: Neomys
        - Southern water shrew, Neomys anomalus LC
        - Eurasian water shrew, Neomys fodiens LC
    - Tribe: Soricini
      - Genus: Sorex
        - Alpine shrew, Sorex alpinus NT
        - Common shrew, Sorex araneus LC
        - Crowned shrew, Sorex coronatus LC
        - Eurasian pygmy shrew, Sorex minutus LC
- Family: Talpidae (moles)
  - Subfamily: Talpinae
    - Tribe: Talpini
      - Genus: Talpa
        - European mole, Talpa europaea LC

== Order: Chiroptera (bats) ==
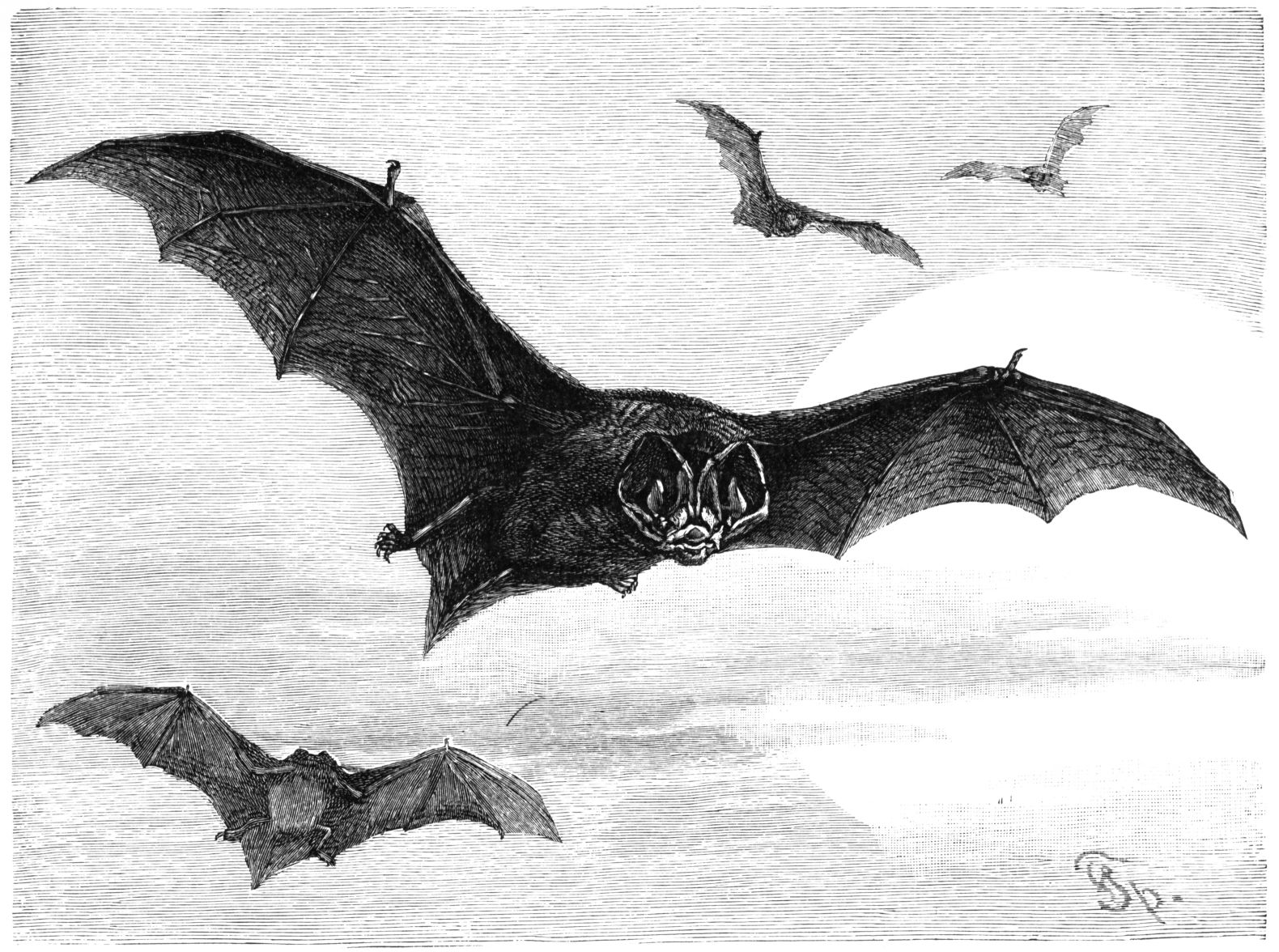
Western barbastelle

The bats' most distinguishing feature is that their forelimbs are developed as wings, making them the only mammals capable of flight. Bat species account for about 20% of all mammals.

- Family: Vespertilionidae
  - Subfamily: Myotinae
    - Genus: Myotis
      - Bechstein's bat, M. bechsteini NT
      - Brandt's bat, M. brandti LC
      - Greater mouse-eared bat, M. myotis LC
  - Subfamily: Vespertilioninae
    - Genus: Barbastella
      - Western barbastelle, B. barbastellus NT
    - Genus: Nyctalus
      - Lesser noctule, N. leisleri LC
    - Genus: Plecotus
      - Grey long-eared bat, P. austriacus NT
- Family: Rhinolophidae
  - Subfamily: Rhinolophinae
    - Genus: Rhinolophus
      - Greater horseshoe bat, R. ferrumequinum LC

== Order: Carnivora (carnivorans) ==
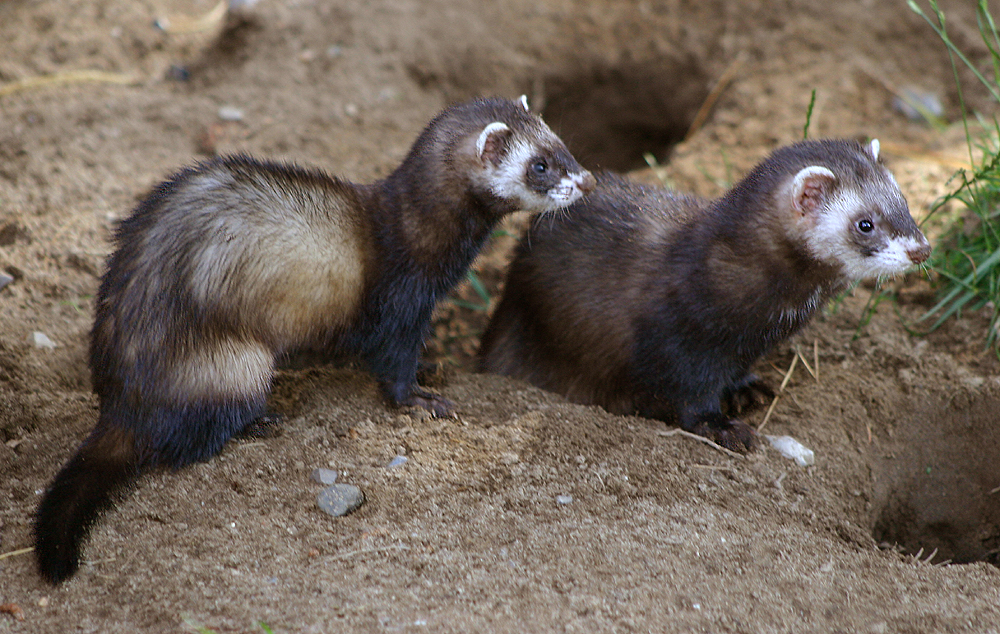
European polecat

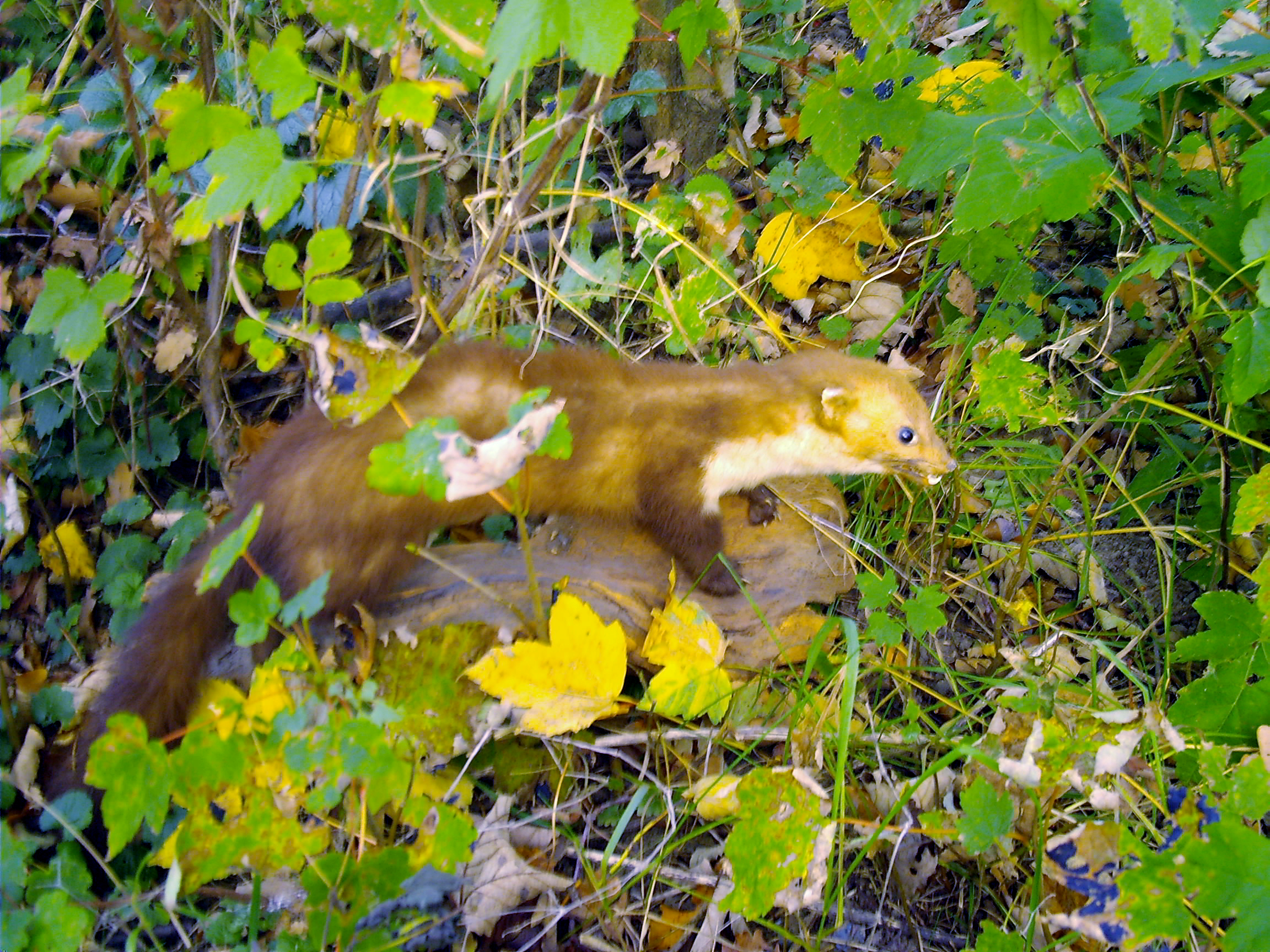
Beech marten

There are over 260 species of carnivorans, the majority of which feed primarily on meat. They have a characteristic skull shape and dentition.

- Suborder: Caniformia
  - Family: Canidae (dogs, foxes)
    - Genus: Vulpes
      - Red fox, V. vulpes LC
  - Family: Mustelidae (mustelids)
    - Genus: Lutra
      - Eurasian otter, L. lutra NT
    - Genus: Martes
      - Beech marten, M. foina LC
      - European pine marten, M. martes LC
    - Genus: Meles
      - European badger, M. meles LC
    - Genus: Mustela
      - Stoat, M. erminea LC
      - Least weasel, M. nivalis LC
      - European polecat, M. putorius LC

== Order: Artiodactyla (even-toed ungulates) ==
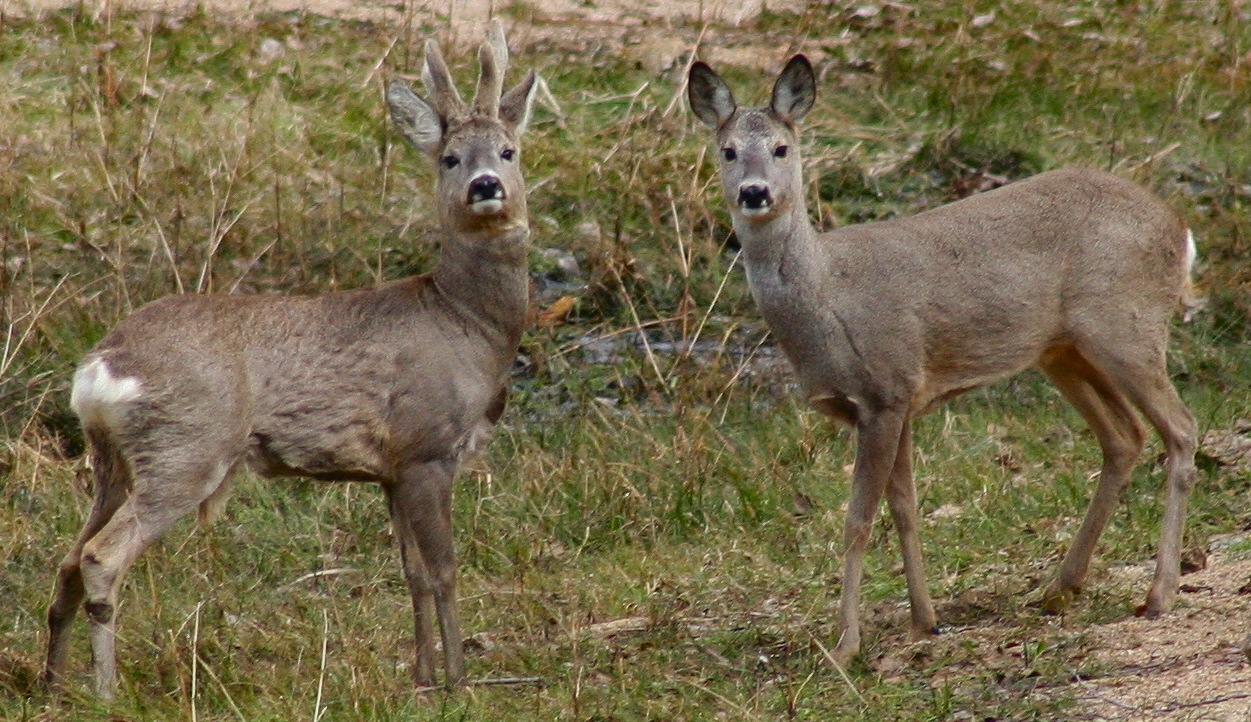
Roe deer

The even-toed ungulates are ungulates whose weight is borne about equally by the third and fourth toes, rather than mostly or entirely by the third as in perissodactyls. There are about 220 artiodactyl species, including many that are of great economic importance to humans.

- Family: Cervidae (deer)
  - Subfamily: Capreolinae
    - Genus: Capreolus
      - Roe deer, C. capreolus LC
  - Subfamily: Cervinae
    - Genus: Cervus
      - Red deer, C. elaphus LC
- Family: Suidae (pigs)
  - Subfamily: Suinae
    - Genus: Sus
      - Wild boar, S. scrofa LC

== Locally extinct ==
The following species are locally extinct in the country:

- European bison, Bison bonasus
- Lesser horseshoe bat, Rhinolophus hipposideros
- Brown bear, Ursus arctos

== See also ==
- List of chordate orders
- Lists of mammals by region
- List of prehistoric mammals
- Mammal classification
- List of mammals described in the 2000s
