= List of mammals of Serbia =

This list shows the IUCN Red List status of the 94 mammal species occurring in Serbia. One is critically endangered, Five of them are vulnerable, seven are near threatened, one is reintroduced, and six are introduced.

Icons which state each species' global IUCN status:
CR	Critically Endangered	In imminent risk of extinction in the wild
EN	Endangered	Facing an extremely high risk of extinction in the wild
VU	Vulnerable	Facing a high risk of extinction in the wild
NT	Near Threatened	Doesn't meet any of the criteria that would categorise it as risking extinction but likely to in the future
LC	Least Concern	No current identifiable risks to this species

== Order: Rodentia ==
There are twenty-nine species of rodent in Serbia. Two species are vulnerable. One species is reintroduced and two species are introduced.

Common name (Serbian name)	Scientific name	Range	IUCN status	Photo
Family: Castoridae
Eurasian beaver (Evropski dabar)	Castor fiber	River banks of the Danube	LC	
Family: Cricetidae
European hamster (Evropski hrčak)	Cricetus cricetus	Vojvodina	CR	
Muskrat (Bizamski pacov)	Ondatra zibethicus	(Introduced); Throughout Serbia	LC	
European water vole (Vodena voluharica)	Arvicola amphibius	Throughout Serbia	LC	
European snow vole (Evropska snežna voluharica)	Chionomys nivalis	SE Serbia	LC	
Balkan snow vole (Dinarska voluharica)	Dinaromys bogdanovi	S Raška	VU	
Field vole	Microtus agrestis	NW Vojvodina	LC	
Common vole (Poljska voluharica)	Microtus arvalis	Throughout Serbia	LC	
Balkan pine vole	Microtus felteni	S Serbia	DD	
Günther's vole	Microtus guentheri	S Serbia	LC	
Southern vole	Microtus levis	W Pčinja	LC	
Liechtenstein's pine vole	Microtus liechtensteini	W Serbia	LC	
European pine vole	Microtus subterraneus	Throughout Serbia	LC	
Bank vole (Šumska voluharica)	Myodes glareolus	W and S Serbia	LC	
Family: Dipodidae
Southern birch mouse	Sicista subtilis	Jasenovo	LC	
Family Gliridae
Forest dormouse	Dryomys nitedula	Throughout Serbia	LC	
European edible dormouse (Obični puh)	Glis glis	Throughout Serbia	LC	
Hazel dormouse (Puh orašar)	Muscardinus avellanarius	Throughout Serbia	LC	
Family: Muridae
Striped field mouse (Poljski miš)	Apodemus agrarius	Throughout Serbia	LC	
Western broad-toothed field mouse	Apodemus epimelas	S Pčinja	LC	
Yellow-necked field mouse (Žutogrli miš)	Apodemus flavicollis	Throughout Serbia	LC	
Long-tailed field mouse (Šumski miš)	Apodemus sylvaticus	Throughout Serbia	LC	
Herb field mouse	Apodemus uralensis	NE Bor	LC	
Eurasian harvest mouse (Patuljasti miš)	Micromys minutus	Throughout Serbia	LC	
Macedonian mouse (Makedonski miš)	Mus macedonicus	S Pčinja	LC	
House mouse (Kućni miš)	Mus musculus	Throughout Serbia	LC	
Steppe mouse	Mus spicilegus	N and E Serbia	LC	
Black rat	Rattus rattus	(Introduced) Throughout Serbia	LC	
Brown rat	Rattus norvegicus	(Introduced) Throughout Serbia	LC	
Family: Sciuridae
Red squirrel (Evropska veverica)	Sciurus vulgaris	Throughout Serbia	LC	
European ground squirrel (Tekunica)	Spermophilus citellus	N Serbia	VU	
Family: Spalacidae
Lesser mole-rat (Slepo kuče)	Spalax leucodon	Throughout Serbia	DD	
Family: Myocastoridae
Coypu (Nutrija)	Myocastor coypus	(Introduced); Danube, Sava, and Tisa river basins	LC	

== Order: Lagomorpha ==
There is one species of lagomorph in Serbia.

Common name	Scientific name	Range	IUCN status	Photo
Family: Leporidae
European hare (Evropski zec)	Lepus europaeus	Throughout Serbia	LC	

== Order: Eulipotyphla ==
There are ten species of eulipotyph in Serbia. One species is near threatened.

Common name (Serbian name)	Scientific name	Range	IUCN status	Photo
Family: Erinaceidae
Northern white-breasted hedgehog (Severni beloprsi jež)	Erinaceus roumanicus	Throughout Serbia	LC	
Family: Soricidae
Bicolored shrew	Crocidura leucodon	Throughout Serbia	LC	
Lesser white-toothed shrew	Crocidura suaveolens	Throughout Serbia	LC	
Mediterranean water shrew	Neomys anomalus	Throughout Serbia	LC	
Eurasian water shrew	Neomys fodiens	Throughout Serbia	LC	
Alpine shrew	Sorex alpinus	W Serbia	NT	
Eurasian shrew	Sorex araneus	Throughout Serbia	LC	
Eurasian pygmy shrew	Sorex minutus	Throughout Serbia	LC	
Family: Talpidae
Blind mole	Talpa caeca	W Serbia	LC	
European mole (Evropska krtica)	Talpa europaea	Throughout Serbia	LC	

== Order: Chiroptera ==
There are thirty-one species of bat in Serbia. Two species are vulnerable and five species are near threatened.

Common name	Scientific name	Range	IUCN status	Photo
Family: Miniopteridae
Common bent-wing bat	Miniopterus schreibersii	Throughout Serbia	VU	
Family: Molossidae
European free-tailed bat	Tadarida teniotis	S Serbia	LC	
Family: Rhinolophidae
Blasius's horseshoe bat	Rhinolophus blasii	SE Serbia	LC	
Mediterranean horseshoe bat	Rhinolophus euryale	C and S Serbia	NT	
Greater horseshoe bat (Veliki potkovnjak)	Rhinolophus ferrumequinum	Throughout Serbia	LC	
Lesser horseshoe bat (Mali potkovnjak)	Rhinolophus hipposideros	Throughout Serbia	LC	
Mehely's horseshoe bat	Rhinolophus mehelyi	Boljevac	VU	
Family: Vespertilionidae
Western barbastelle	Barbastella barbastellus	N Serbia	NT	
Serotine bat	Eptesicus serotinus	Throughout Serbia	LC	
Alcathoe whiskered bat	Myotis alcathoe	Throughout Serbia (probably)	DD	
Steppe whiskered bat	Myotis aurascens	Pčinja	LC	
Bechstein's bat	Myotis bechsteinii	N Serbia	NT	
Lesser mouse-eared bat	Myotis blythii	Throughout Serbia	LC	
Brandt's bat	Myotis brandtii	Throughout Serbia	LC	
Long-fingered bat	Myotis capaccinii	S Serbia	VU	
Pond bat	Myotis dasycneme	NE Serbia	NT	
Daubenton's bat	Myotis daubentonii	N, E and S Serbia	LC	
Geoffroy's bat	Myotis emarginatus	Throughout Serbia	LC	
Greater mouse-eared bat	Myotis myotis	Throughout Serbia	LC	
Whiskered bat	Myotis mystacinus	Throughout Serbia	LC	
Natterer's bat	Myotis nattereri	Throughout Serbia	LC	
Lesser noctule (Mali noćnik)	Nyctalus leisleri	Throughout Serbia	LC	
Common noctule	Nyctalus noctula	Throughout Serbia	LC	
Kuhl's pipistrelle	Pipistrellus kuhlii	Throughout Serbia	LC	
Nathusius's pipistrelle	Pipistrellus nathusii	Throughout Serbia	LC	
Common pipistrelle	Pipistrellus pipistrellus	Throughout Serbia	LC	
Pygmy pipistrelle	Pipistrellus pygameus	N Vojvodina	LC	
Savi's pipistrelle	Hypsugo savii	Belgrade and S Serbia	LC	
Brown big-eared bat	Plecotus auritus	Throughout Serbia	LC	
Grey long-eared bat	Plecotus austriacus	Throughout Serbia	NT	
Parti-coloured bat	Vespertilio murinus	Throughout Serbia	LC	

== Order: Carnivora ==
There are fourteen species of carnivore in Serbia. One species is vulnerable and one species is near threatened.

Common name (Serbian name)	Scientific name	Range	IUCN status	Photo
Family: Canidae
Golden jackal (Zlatni šakal)	Canis aureus	Throughout Serbia	LC	
Grey wolf (Sivi vuk)	Canis lupus	SW to E Serbia	LC	
Red fox (Riđa lisica)	Vulpes vulpes	Throughout Serbia	LC	
Raccoon dog (Jenotski pas)	Nyctereutes procyonoides	(Introduced); Scattered records in N and E Serbia	LC	
Family: Felidae
European wildcat (Divlja mačka)	Felis silvestris	Throughout Serbia	LC	
Eurasian lynx (Obični ris)	Lynx lynx	E Serbia	LC	
Family: Mustelidae
European otter (Evroazijska vidra)	Lutra lutra	Throughout Serbia	NT	
Beech marten (Kuna belica)	Martes foina	Throughout Serbia	LC	
European pine marten (Kuna zlatica)	Martes martes	Throughout Serbia	LC	
European badger (Jazavac)	Meles meles	Throughout Serbia	LC	
Stoat (Velika lasica)	Mustela erminea	N Serbia	LC	
Steppe polecat (Stepeni tvor)	Mustela eversmanii	NE and E Serbia	LC	
Least weasel	Mustela nivalis	Throughout Serbia	LC	
European polecat (Tvor)	Mustela putorius	Throughout Serbia	LC	
American mink	Neogale vison	Introduced	LC	
Marbled polecat	Vormela peregusna	SE and E Serbia	VU	
Family: Ursidae
Eurasian brown bear (Mrki medved)	Ursus arctos arctos	W Serbia	LC	

== Order: Artiodactyla ==
There are five species of even-toed ungulate in Serbia.

Common name	Scientific name	Range	IUCN status	Photo
Family: Bovidae
Chamois (Divokoza)	Rupicapra rupicapra	Đerdap National Park, Brestovac, Grobnice	LC	
Family: Cervidae
Roe deer (Srna)	Capreolus capreolus	Throughout Serbia	LC	
Red deer (Crveni jelen)	Cervus elaphus	N and E Serbia	LC	
European fallow deer (Jelen lopatar)	Dama dama	Throughout Serbia	LC	
Family: Suidae
Wild boar (Divlja svinja)	Sus scrofa	Throughout Serbia	LC	

== Locally extinct ==
The following species are locally extinct in the country:

- European bison, Bison bonasus
- European mink, Mustela lutreola

== See also ==
- List of chordate orders
- Lists of mammals by region
