= List of mammals of Denmark =

This is a list of the mammal species recorded in Denmark, listing only species found outside captivity and fenced enclosures, or with certain records younger than 1000 AD. The main source is the most recent atlas survey of mammals in Denmark. The atlas records 88 mammal species in Denmark. Since the atlas was published in 2007, four new species have been recorded in the country: the grey wolf (returned after regional extinction in early 1800) golden jackal, Cuvier's beaked whale and grey long-eared bat.

The following tags are used to highlight each species' conservation status in the most current version of the Danish Red List. Assessments were made following recommendations of the International Union for Conservation of Nature.

EX	Extinct	No reasonable doubt that the last individual has died.
EW	Extinct in the wild	Known only to survive in captivity or as a naturalized populations well outside its previous range.
RE	Regionally extinct	No reasonable doubt that the species no longer exist in the assessed region and is extirpated.
CR	Critically endangered	The species is in imminent risk of extinction in the wild.
EN	Endangered	The species is facing an extremely high risk of extinction in the wild.
VU	Vulnerable	The species is facing a high risk of extinction in the wild.
NT	Near threatened	The species does not meet any of the criteria that would categorise it as risking extinction but it is likely to do so in the future.
LC	Least concern	There are no current identifiable risks to the species.
DD	Data deficient	There is inadequate information to make an assessment of the risks to this species.
NA	Not assessed	Not assessed, either because it is an invading/naturalised species, or extremely rare visitor

== Eulipotyphlans ==
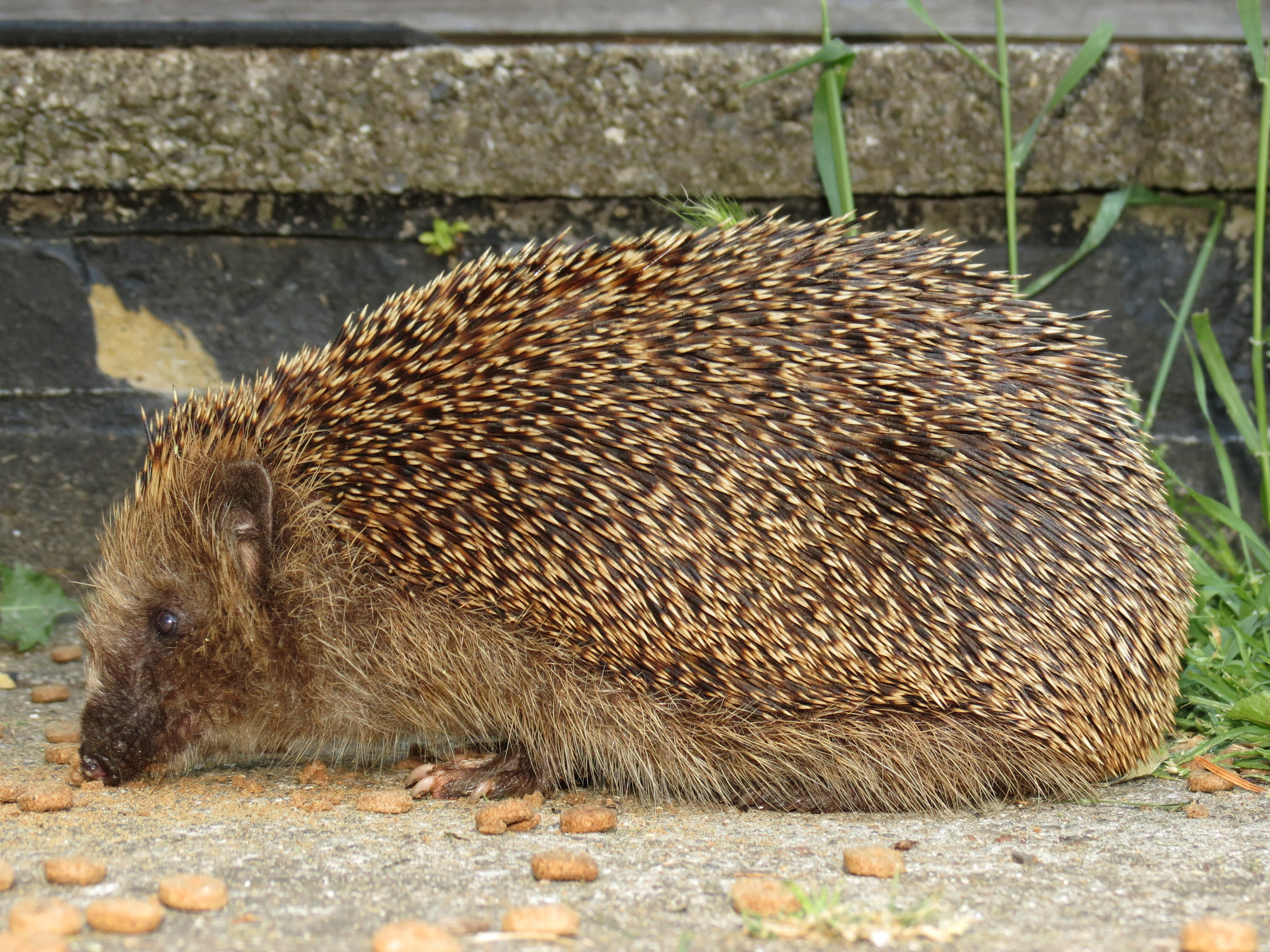
West European hedgehog

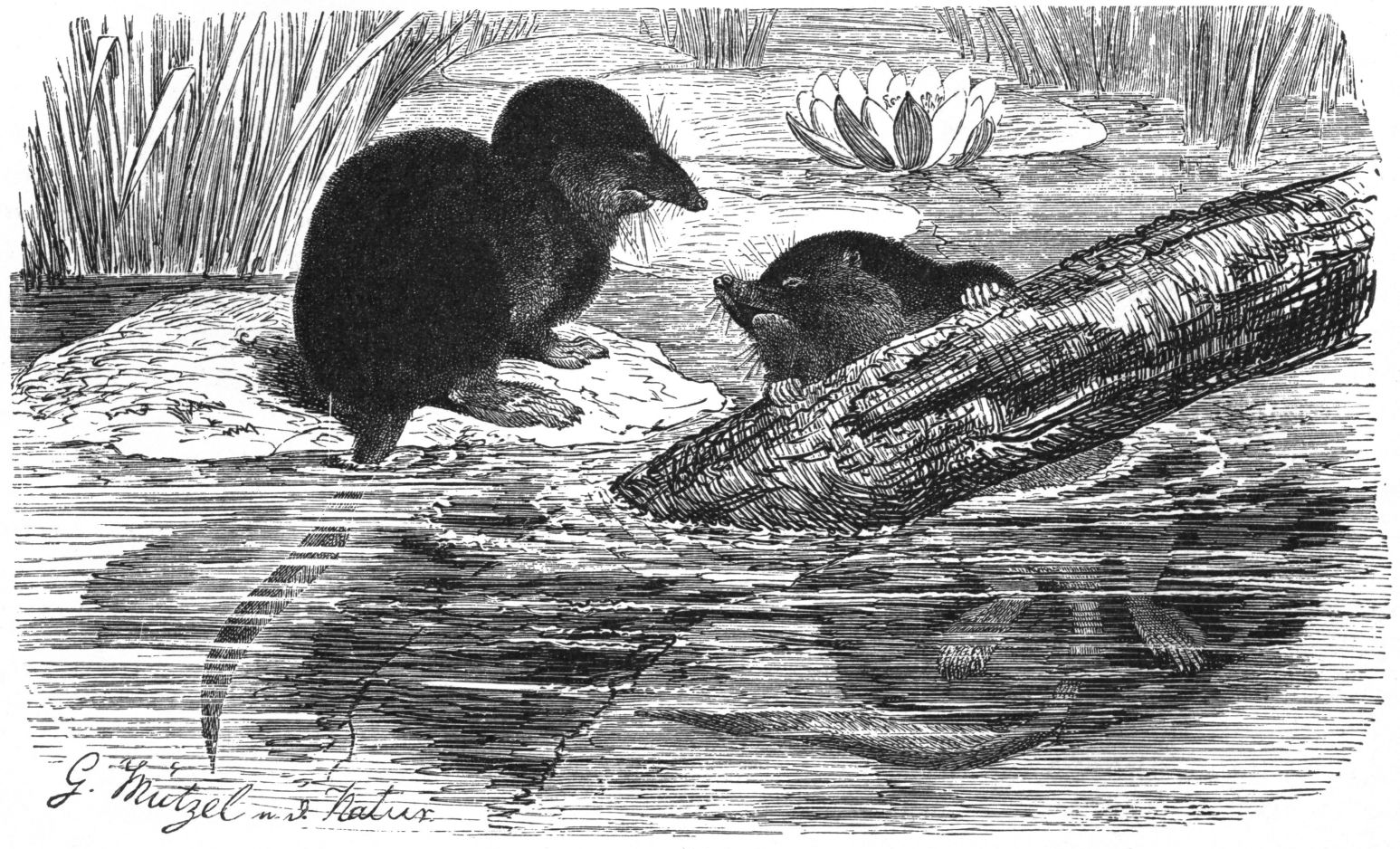
Eurasian water shrew

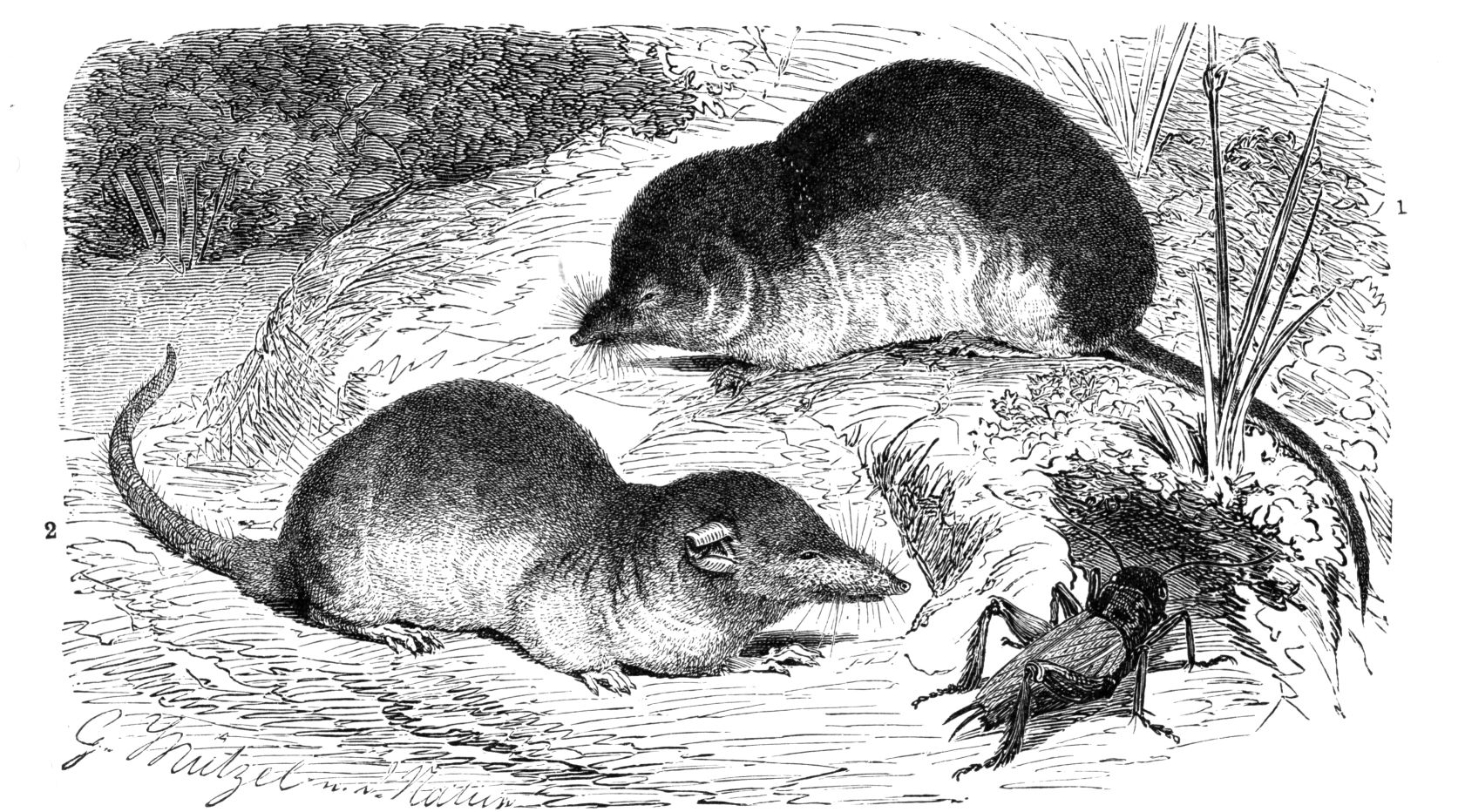
Common shrew

=== Erinaceidae (hedgehogs) ===
- West European hedgehog, Erinaceus europaeus LC

=== Talpidae (moles) ===
- European mole, Talpa europaea LC

=== Soricidae (shrews) ===
- Eurasian water shrew, Neomys fodiens NT
- Common shrew, Sorex araneus LC
- Eurasian pygmy shrew, Sorex minutus LC

== Bats ==
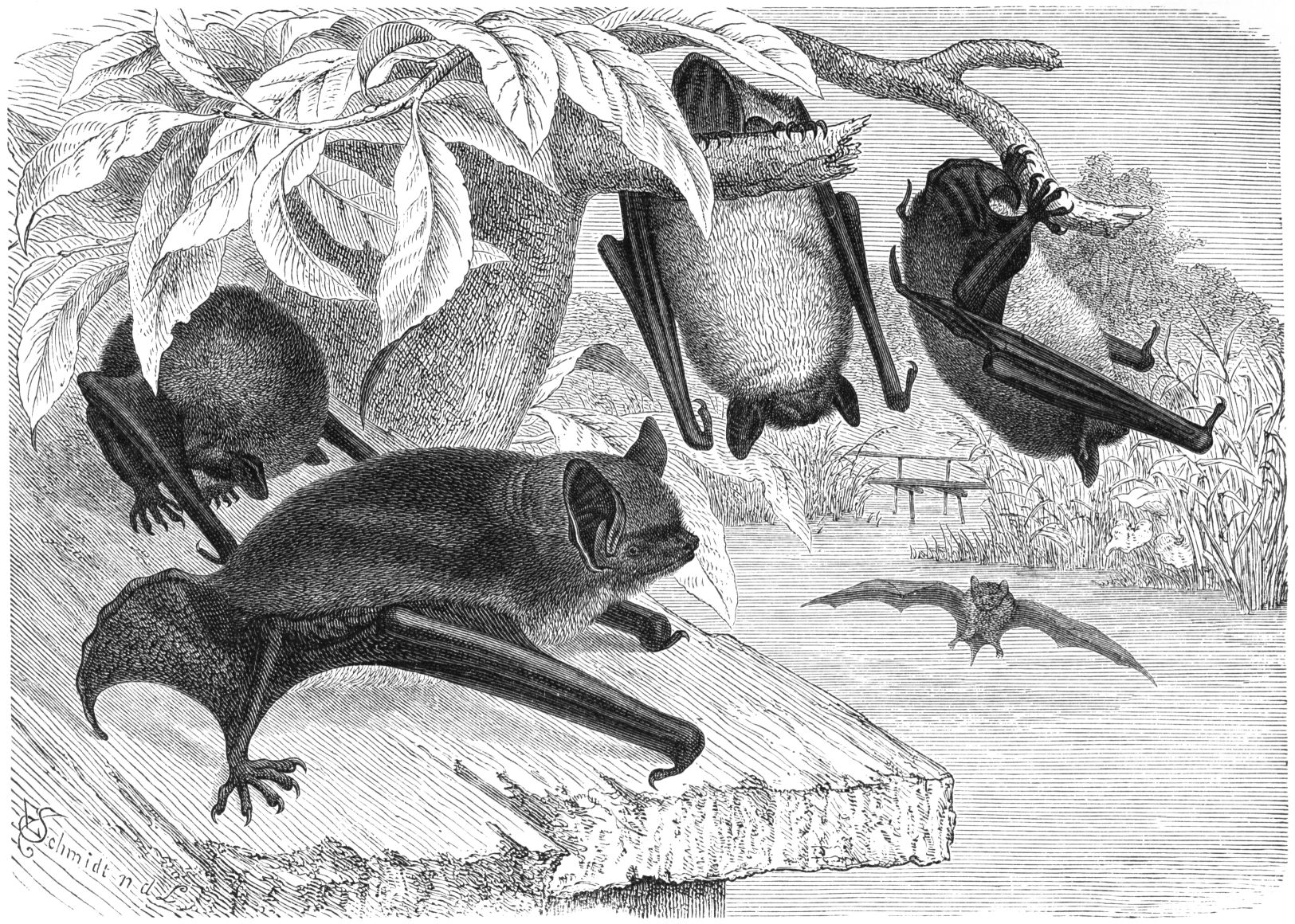
Daubenton's bat

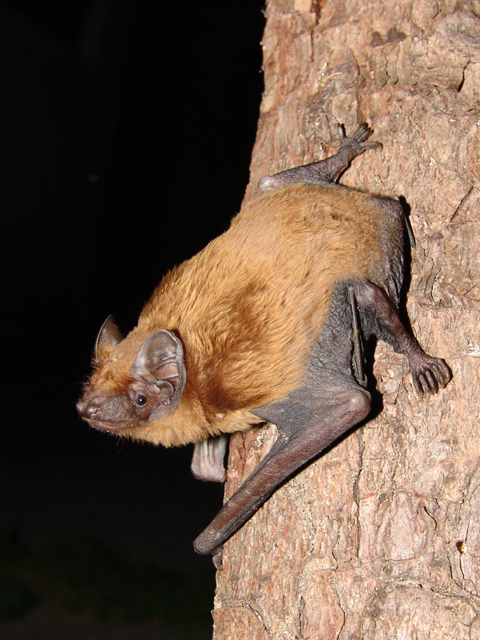
Common noctule

=== Vespertilionidae (evening bats) ===
- Western barbastelle, Barbastella barbastellus NT
- Serotine bat, Eptesicus serotinus LC
- Northern bat, Eptesicus nilssonii DD
- Bechstein's bat, Myotis bechsteinii EN
- Brandt's bat, Myotis brandti NT
- Pond bat, Myotis dasycneme VU
- Daubenton's bat, Myotis daubentonii LC
- Greater mouse-eared bat, Myotis myotis NA
- Whiskered bat, Myotis mystacinus VU
- Natterer's bat, Myotis nattereri NT
- Common noctule, Nyctalus noctula LC
- Lesser noctule, Nyctalus leisleri DD
- Nathusius's pipistrelle, Pipistrellus nathusii LC
- Common pipistrelle, Pipistrellus pipistrellus LC
- Soprano pipistrelle, Pipistrellus pygmaeus LC
- Brown long-eared bat, Plecotus auritus LC
- Grey long-eared bat, Plecotus austriacus NA
- Parti-coloured bat, Vespertilio murinus LC

== Lagomorphs ==
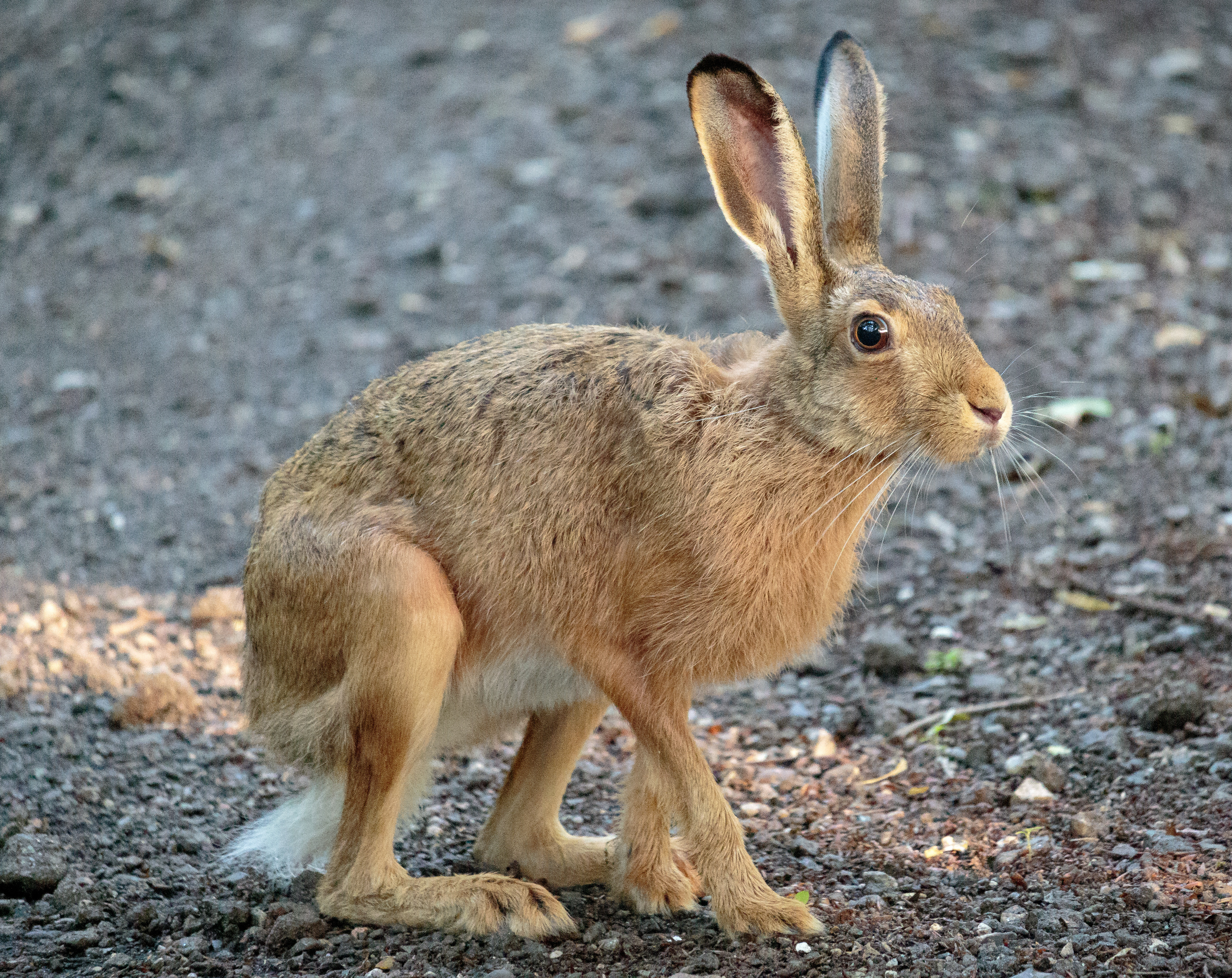
European hare

- European rabbit, Oryctolagus cuniculus NA
- European hare, Lepus europaeus LC

== Rodents ==
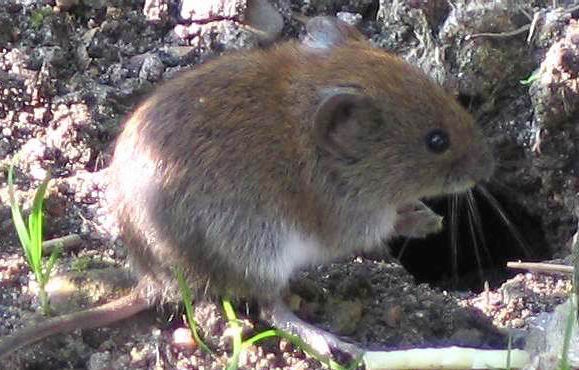
Bank vole

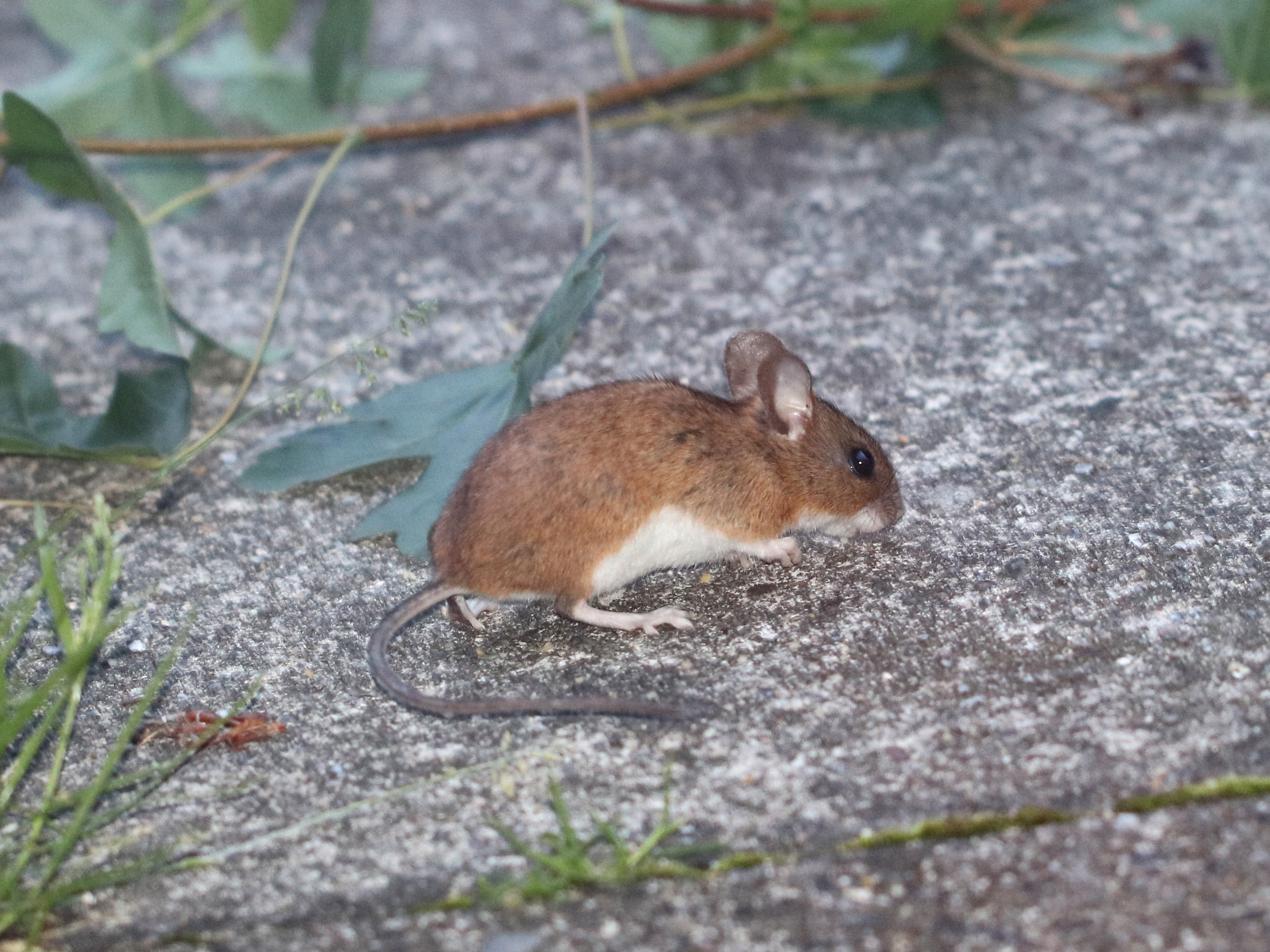
Yellow-necked mouse

=== Sciuridae (squirrels) ===
- Red squirrel, Sciurus vulgaris LC
- Siberian chipmunk, Eutamias sibiricus NA introduced

=== Castoridae (beavers) ===
- Eurasian beaver, Castor fiber EN

=== Gliridae (dormice) ===
- Garden dormouse, Eliomys quercinus DD
- Hazel dormouse, Muscardinus avellanarius EN

=== Cricetidae (voles) ===
- Water vole, Arvicola terrestris LC
- Bank vole, Myodes glareolus LC
- Field vole, Microtus agrestis LC
- Common vole, Microtus arvalis LC
- Muskrat, Ondatra zibethicus NA introduced

=== Muridae ===
- Yellow-necked mouse, Apodemus flavicollis LC
- Striped field mouse, Apodemus agrarius LC
- Wood mouse, Apodemus sylvaticus NT
- Harvest mouse, Micromys minutus LC
- Brown rat, Rattus norvegicus NA
- House mouse, Mus musculus NT
- Black rat, Rattus rattus RE

=== Dipodidae ===
- Northern birch mouse, Sicista betulina VU

=== Myocastoridae ===
- Coypu, Myocastor coypus NA introduced

== Carnivorans ==
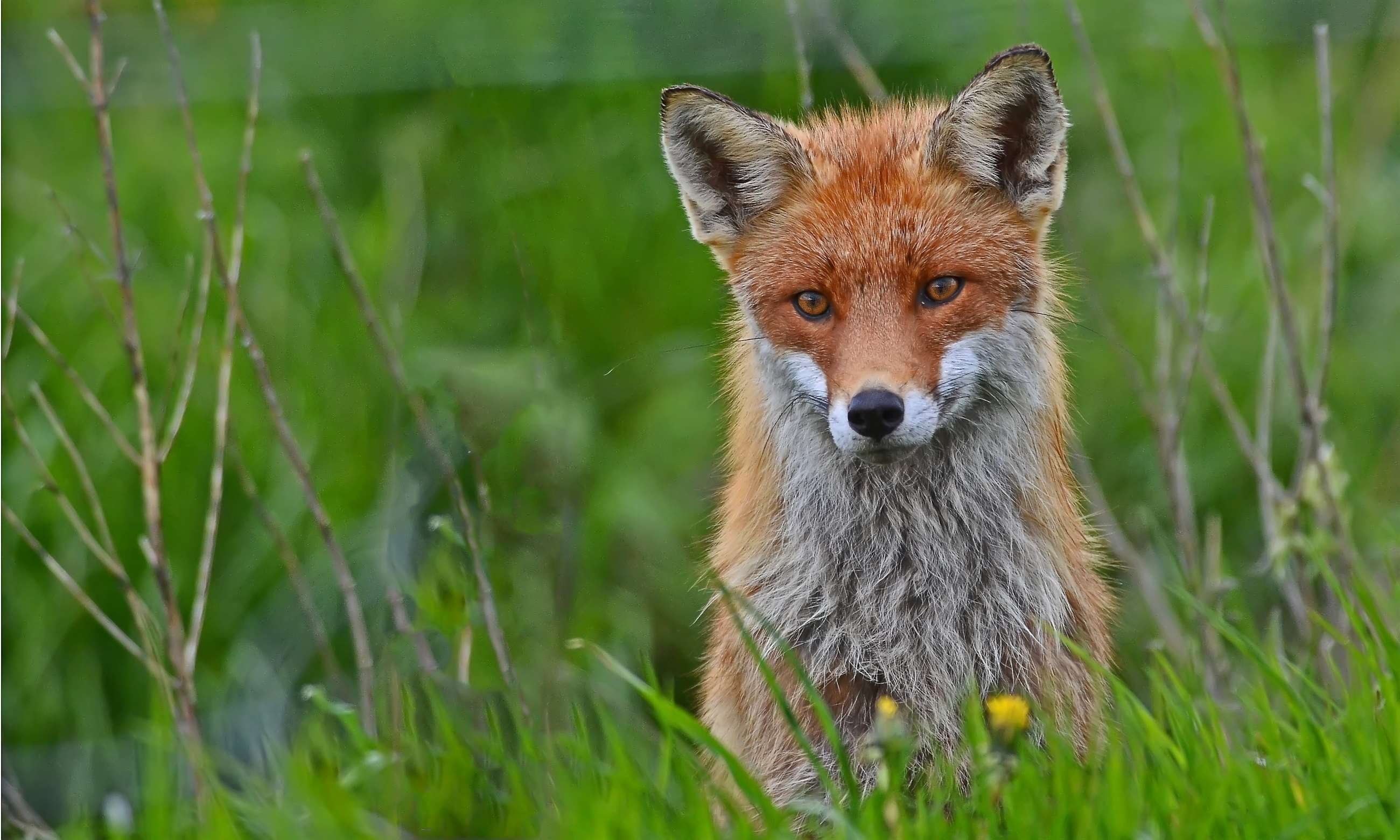
Red fox

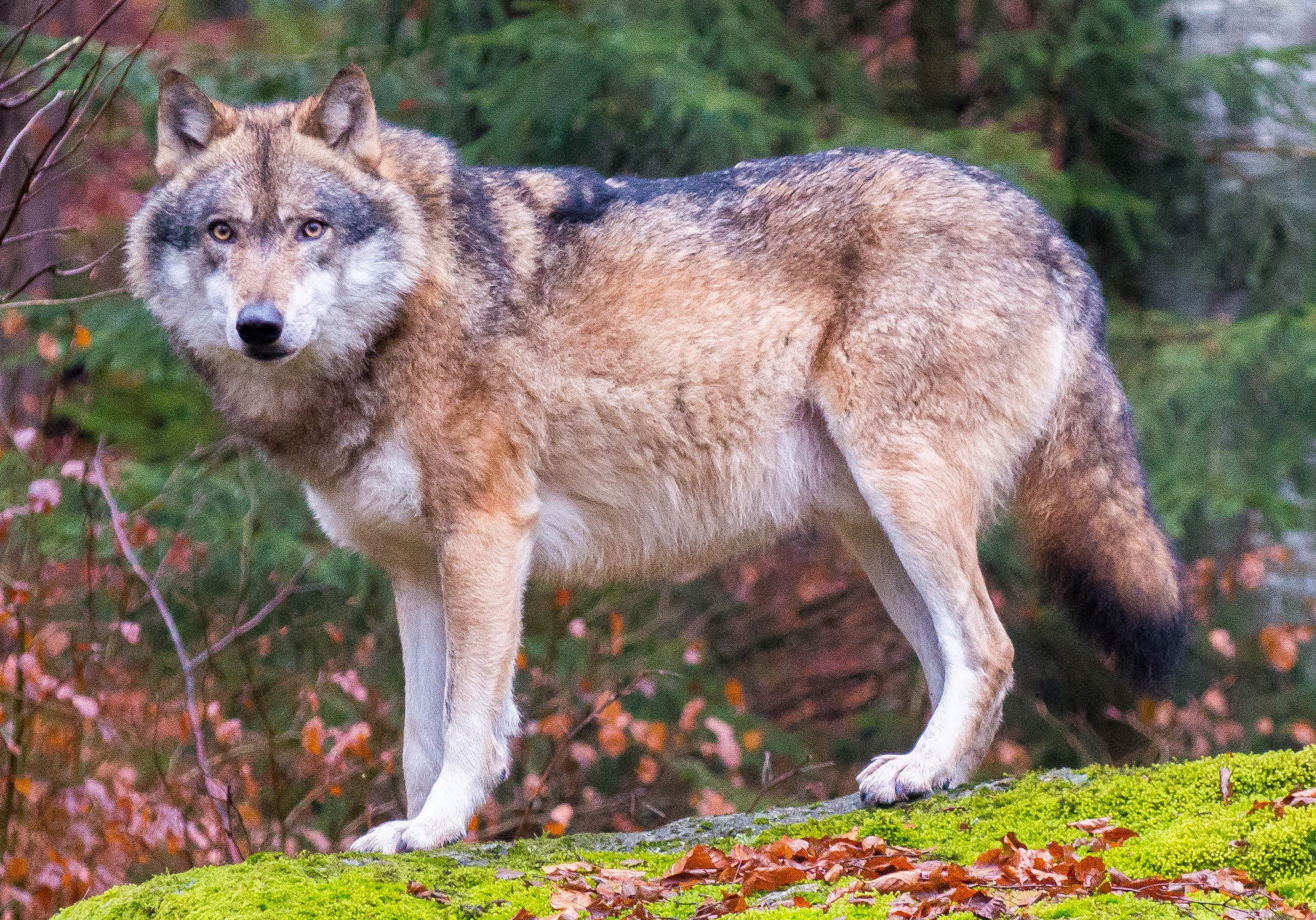
Gray wolf

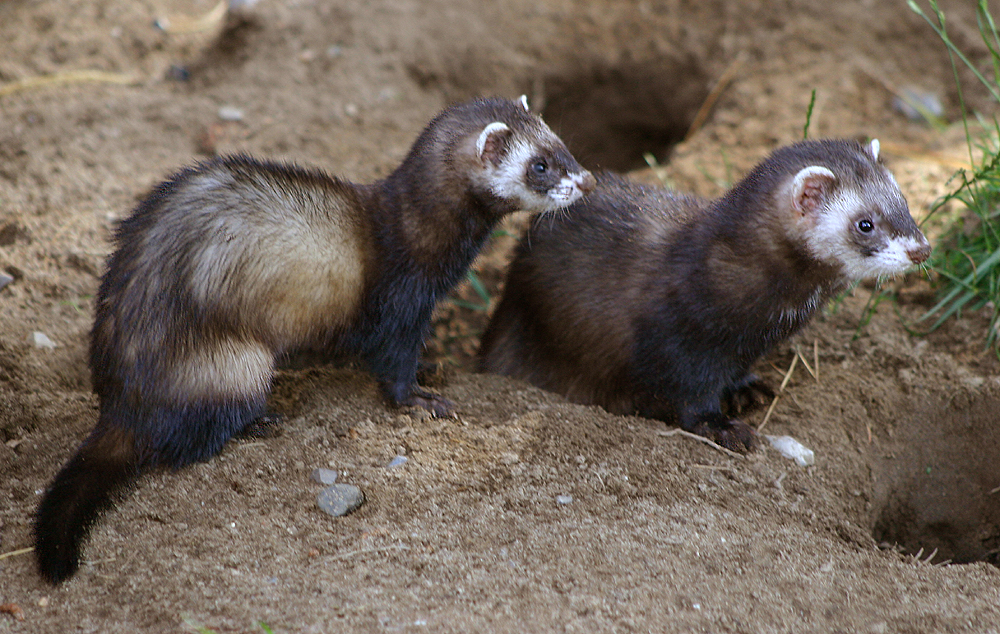
European polecat

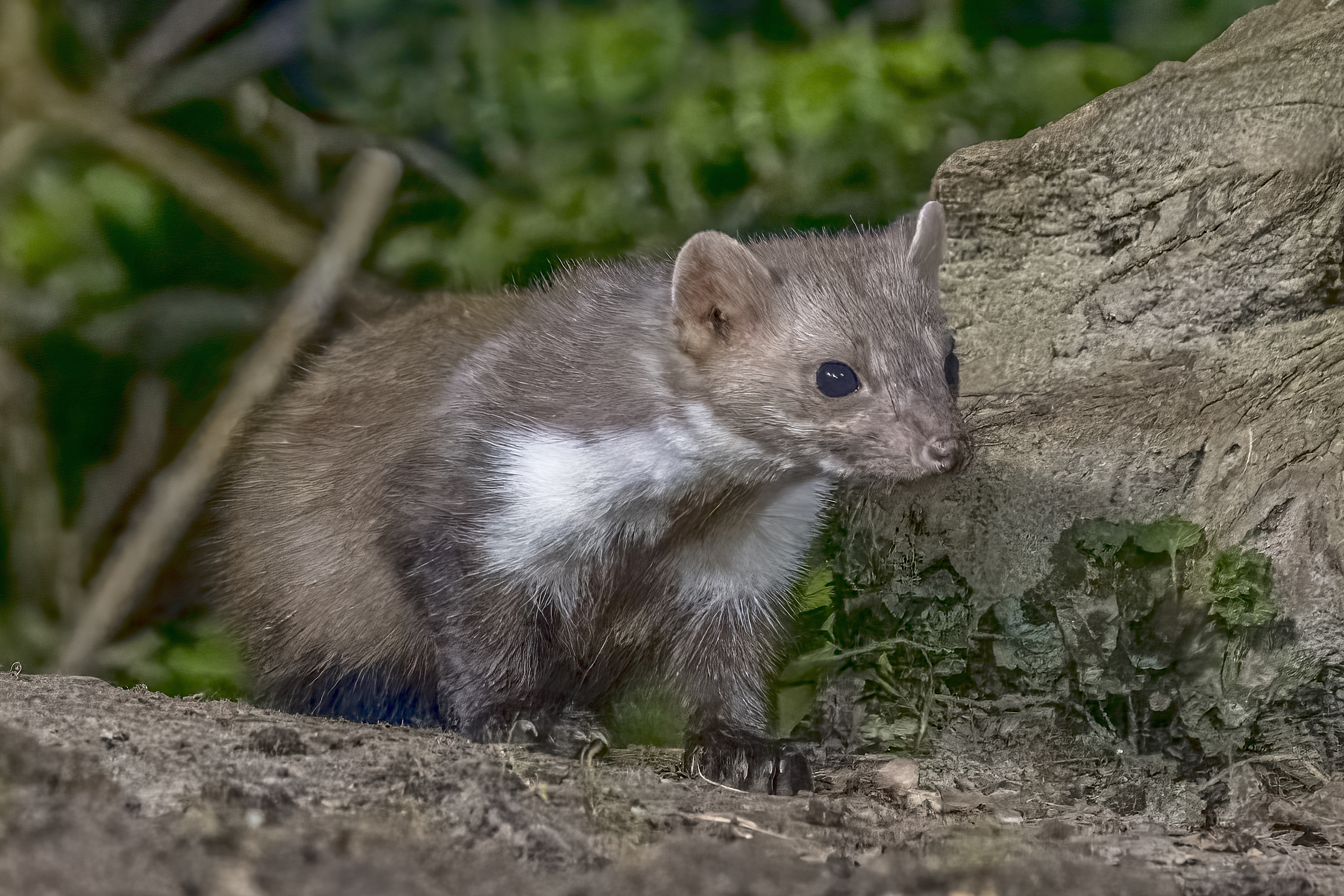
Beech marten

=== Canidae (dogs, foxes) ===
- Golden jackal, Canis aureus NA vagrant
- Grey wolf, Canis lupus VU
- Raccoon dog, Nyctereutes procyonoides NA introduced
- Red fox, Vulpes vulpes NT

=== Procyonidae (raccoons and relatives) ===
- Raccoon, Procyon lotor NA introduced

=== Mustelidae (mustelids) ===
- European otter, Lutra lutra VU
- Beech marten, Martes foina NT
- Pine marten, Martes martes NT
- European badger, Meles meles LC
- Stoat, Mustela erminea NT
- Least weasel, Mustela nivalis NT
- European polecat, Mustela putorius NT
- American mink, Neogale vison NA introduced

=== Odobenidae ===
- Walrus, Odobenus rosmarus NA vagrant

=== Phocidae (earless seals) ===
- Hooded seal, Cystophora cristata NA vagrant
- Common seal, Phoca vitulina LC
- Ringed seal, Pusa hispida NA vagrant
- Grey seal, Halichoerus grypus VU
- Harp seal, Pagophilus groenlandicus NA vagrant

== Cetacea ==
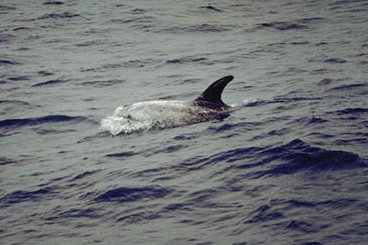
Risso's dolphin

Killer whales jumping

=== Balaenopteridae ===
- Blue whale, Balaenoptera musculus NA vagrant
- Sei whale, Balaenoptera borealis NA vagrant
- Bryde's whale, Balaenoptera edeni NA vagrant
- Fin whale, Balaenoptera physalus NA vagrant
- Common minke whale, Balaenoptera acutorostrata LC
- Humpback whale, Megaptera novaeangliae NA vagrant

=== Phocoenidae (porpoises) ===
- Harbour porpoise, Phocoena phocoena LC

=== Monodontidae ===
- Beluga, Delphinapterus leucas NA vagrant

=== Physeteridae (sperm whales) ===
- Sperm whale, Physeter macrocephalus NA vagrant

=== Ziphidae (beaked whales) ===
- Sowerby's beaked whale, Mesoplodon bidens NA vagrant
- Northern bottlenose whale, Hyperoodon ampullatus NA vagrant
- Cuvier's beaked whale, Ziphius cavirostris NA vagrant

=== Delphinidae ===
- White-beaked dolphin, Lagenorhynchus albirostris LC
- Atlantic white-sided dolphin, Lagenorhynchus acutus NA
- Short-beaked common dolphin, Delphinus delphis NA vagrant
- Striped dolphin, Sternella coeruleoalba NA vagrant
- Bottlenose dolphin, Tursiops truncatus NA
- Risso's dolphin, Grampus griseus NA vagrant
- False killer whale, Pseudorca crassidens NA vagrant
- Long-finned pilot whale, Globicephala melas NA vagrant
- Killer whale, Orcinus orca NA vagrant

== Even-toed ungulates ==
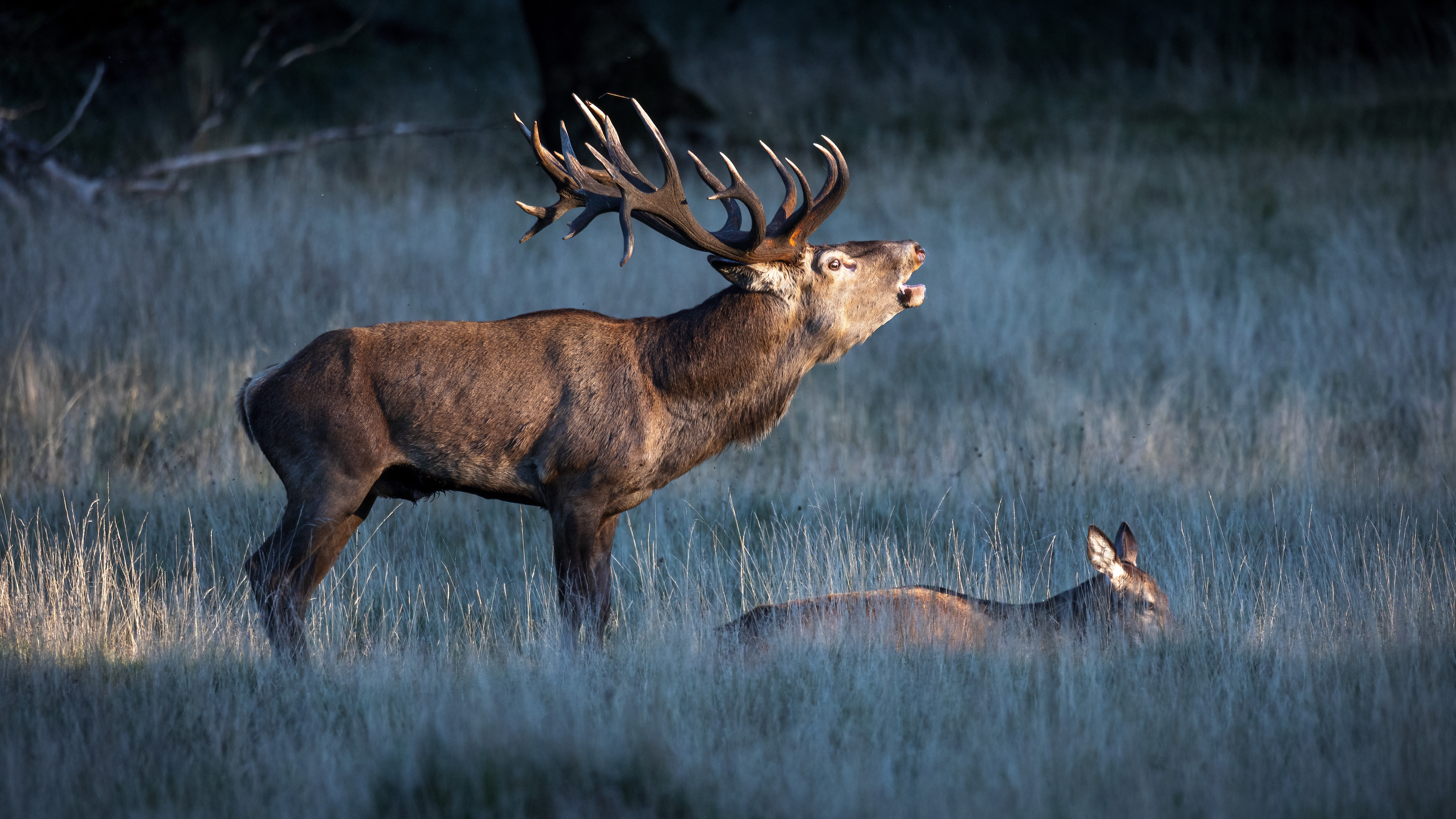
Red deer

=== Suidae (pigs) ===
- Wild boar, Sus scrofa CR

=== Cervidae (deer) ===
- Eurasian elk Alces alces NA vagrant
- Roe deer, Capreolus capreolus LC
- Red deer, Cervus elaphus LC
- Sika deer, Cervus nippon NA introduced
- European fallow deer, Dama dama NA introduced
