= List of mammals of Norway =

The following is a list of mammals with non-domesticated populations in Norway.

== Insectivores ==
=== Hedgehogs ===
- European hedgehog, Erinaceus europaeus

=== Shrews ===
- Eurasian water shrew, Neomys fodiens
- Common shrew, Sorex araneus
- Laxmann's shrew, Sorex caecutiens
- Taiga shrew, Sorex isodon
- Eurasian pygmy shrew, Sorex minutus
- Eurasian least shrew, Sorex minutissimus

== Bats ==
- Northern bat, Eptesicus nilssonii
- Brandt's bat, Myotis brandtii
- Daubenton's bat, Myotis daubentonii
- Whiskered bat, Myotis mystacinus
- Natterer's bat, Myotis nattereri
- Common noctule, Nyctalus noctula
- Nathusius's pipistrelle, Pipistrellus nathusii
- Soprano pipistrelle, Pipistrellus pygmaeus
- Brown long-eared bat, Plecotus auritus LC
- Parti-coloured bat, Vespertilio murinus

== Lagomorphs ==
- European hare, Lepus europaeus
- Mountain hare, Lepus timidus
- European rabbit, Oryctolgaus cuniculus introduced

== Rodents ==
=== Squirrels ===
- Red squirrel, Sciurus vulgaris

=== Beavers ===
- European beaver, Castor fiber

=== Muroids ===
- Yellow-necked mouse, Apodemus flavicollis
- Wood mouse, Apodemus sylvaticus
- North-western water vole, Arvicola terrestris
- Grey red-backed vole, Clethrionomys rufocanus
- Bank vole, Clethrionomys glareolus
- Northern red-backed vole, Clethrionomys rutilus
- Norway lemming, Lemmus lemmus
- Field vole, Microtus agrestis
- Eurasian harvest mouse, Micromys minutus
- Root vole, Microtus oeconomus
- Sibling vole, Microtus rossiaemeridionalis (Svalbard only)
- House mouse, Mus musculus
- Wood lemming, Myopus schisticolor
- Muskrat, Ondatra zibethicus introduced
- Brown rat, Rattus norvegicus

=== Birch mice ===
- Northern birch mouse, Sicista betulina

== Cetaceans ==
=== Beaked whales ===
- Northern bottlenose whale, Hyperoodon ampullatus
- Sowerby's beaked whale, Mesoplodon bidens

=== White whales ===
- White whale, Delphinapterus leucas
- Narwhal, Monodon monoceros

=== Sperm whales ===
- Sperm whale, Physeter macrocephalus

=== Porpoises ===
- Common porpoise, Phocoena phocoena

=== Dolphins ===
- Short-beaked common dolphin, Delphinus delphi
- Pilot whale, Globicephala melaena
- Risso's dolphin, Grampus griseus
- White-beaked dolphin, Lagenorhynchus albirostris
- Atlantic white-sided dolphin, Lagenorhynchus acutus
- Orca, Orcinus orca
- Striped dolphin, Stenella coeruleoalba vagrant
- Common bottlenose dolphin, Tursiops truncatus

=== Baleen whales ===
- Bowhead whale, Balaena mysticetus
- Minke whale, Balaenoptera acuturostrata
- Sei whale, Balaenoptera borealis
- Blue whale, Balaenoptera musculus
- Fin whale, Balaenoptera physalis
- North Atlantic right whale, Eubalaena glacialis vagrant
- Humpback whale, Megaptera novaeangliae

== Carnivorans ==
=== Canids ===
- Gray wolf, Canis lupus
- Raccoon dog, Nyctereutes procyonoides introduced
- Arctic fox, Vulpes lagopus
- Red fox, Vulpes vulpes

=== Bears ===
- Brown bear, Ursus arctos
- Polar bear, Ursus maritimus (Svalbard only)

=== Mustelids ===
- Wolverine, Gulo gulo
- Eurasian otter, Lutra lutra
- Pine marten, Martes martes
- European badger, Meles meles
- Stoat, Mustela erminea
- Least weasel, Mustela nivalis
- European polecat, Mustela putorius
- American mink, Neogale vison introduced

=== Cats ===
- Eurasian lynx, Lynx lynx

=== Pinnipeds ===
- Hooded seal, Cystophora cristata
- Bearded seal, Erignatus barbatus
- Grey seal, Halichoerus grypus
- Walrus, Odobenus rosmarus
- Harp seal, Phoca groenlandica
- Ringed seal, Phoca hispida
- Common seal, Phoca vitulina

== Even-toed ungulates ==
=== Pigs ===
- Wild boar, Sus scrofa extirpated

=== Deer ===
- Elk, Alces alces
- Roe deer, Capreolus capreolus
- Red deer, Cervus elaphus
- European fallow deer, Dama dama introduced
- Reindeer, Rangifer tarandus

=== Cattle ===
- Musk ox, Ovibos moschatus reintroduced

== Sources ==
- Atlas on mammals, by the Norwegian Zoological Society (in Norwegian)

== See also ==
- List of European mammals
- Norwegian Black List
