= List of amphibians of Metropolitan France =

Amphibians of Metropolitan France include:

== Frogs and toads (Anura) ==
=== Ranidae ===
Native ranid species of Metropolitan France
| Common name | Scientific name | Range | IUCN status (France) | IUCN status (worldwide) | Refs. |
|---|---|---|---|---|---|
| Edible frog | Pelophylax kl. esculentus (Linnaeus, 1758) | | NT | LC | |
| Graf's hybrid frog | Pelophylax kl. grafi (Crochet, Dubois, Ohler & Tunner, 1995) | | NT | NE | |
| Pool frog | Pelophylax lessonae (Camerano, 1882) | | NT | LC | |
| Perez's frog | Pelophylax perezi (López-Seoane, 1885) | | NT | LC | |
| Marsh frog | Pelophylax ridibundus (Pallas, 1771) | | LC | LC | |
| Moor frog | Rana arvalis Nilsson, 1842 | | EN | LC | |
| Agile frog | Rana dalmatina Fitzinger in Bonaparte, 1839 | | LC | LC | |
| Pyrenean frog | Rana pyrenaica Serra-Cobo, 1993 | | EN | EN | |
| Common frog | Rana temporaria Linnaeus, 1758 | | LC | LC | |

=== Bufonidae ===
- Bufo bufo, common toad

== Salamanders (Caudata) ==
=== Salamandridae ===
- Lissotriton vulgaris, common newt
- Salamandra salamandra, fire salamander

== See also ==
- List of amphibians of Corsica
- Fauna of Metropolitan France
- List of amphibians and reptiles of Guadeloupe
- List of amphibians and reptiles of Martinique
