= List of amphibians and reptiles of Denmark =

This is a list of amphibians and reptiles found in Denmark. It does not include species found only in captivity or extinct species. The conservation status provided is from the most recent Danish Red List, with assessment criteria following IUCN. Sea turtles are not included in the national assessment, thus the most recent IUCN assessment is given.

Summary of 2006 IUCN Red List categories.

Conservation status - IUCN Red List of Threatened Species:

EX - Extinct, EW - extinct in the wild
CR - Critically endangered, EN - Endangered, VU - Vulnerable
NT - Near threatened, LC - Least concern
DD - Data deficient, NE - Not evaluated

== Amphibians ==
=== Salamanders ===
Family: Salamandridae (true salamanders and newts)

- Great crested newt (Triturus cristatus) LC
- Alpine newt (Ichthyosaura alpestris) LC
- Smooth newt (Lissotriton vulgaris) LC

=== Frogs and toads ===
Family: Bombinatoridae (fire-bellied toads)

- European fire-bellied toad (Bombina bombina) NT

Family: Pelobatidae (European spadefoot toads)

- Common spadefoot (Pelobates fuscus) VU

Family: Bufonidae (true toads)

- Common toad (Bufo bufo) LC
- Natterjack toad (Bufo calamita) EN
- European green toad (Pseudepidalea (Bufo) viridis) EN

Family: Hylidae (tree frogs and their allies)

- Common tree frog (Hyla arborea) NT

Family: Ranidae (true frogs)

Typical frogs
- Common frog (Rana temporaria) LC
- Moor frog (Rana arvalis) NT
- Agile frog (Rana dalmatina) LC
Water frogs
- Marsh frog (Pelophylax ridibundus) EN
- Edible frog (Pelophylax kl. esculentus) LC

== Reptiles ==
Family: Lacertidae (wall or true lizards)

- Viviparous lizard (Zootoca vivipara) LC
- Sand lizard (Lacerta agilis) VU
- Common wall lizard (Podarcis muralis) NE, Small local population in Frederikssund since approx. 2018. Of unknown origin

Family: Anguidae

- Slowworm (Anguis fragilis) LC

Family: Viperidae (vipers)

- European adder (Vipera berus) LC

Family: Colubridae (colubrid snakes)

- Grass snake (Natrix natrix) LC
- Smooth snake (Coronella austriaca) DD, last confirmed finding from 1914
- Aesculapian snake (Zamenis longissimus) DD, last confirmed finding from 1863

Family: Emydidae (pond turtles)

- European pond turtle (Emys orbicularis) DD Almost certainly animals released from captivity or their descendants
- Red-eared slider (Trachemys scripta) NE Invasive species

Family: Cheloniidae

- Loggerhead sea turtle, Caretta caretta EN vagrant, very rare
- Kemp's ridley sea turtle, Lepidochelys kempii CR vagrant, very rare
- Green turtle, Chelonia mydas EN vagrant, one recorded stranding

Family: Dermochelyidae

- Leatherback turtle, Dermochelys coriacea VU (Northwest Atlantic Ocean subpopulation: LC) vagrant, rare
