= List of amphibians of Malta =

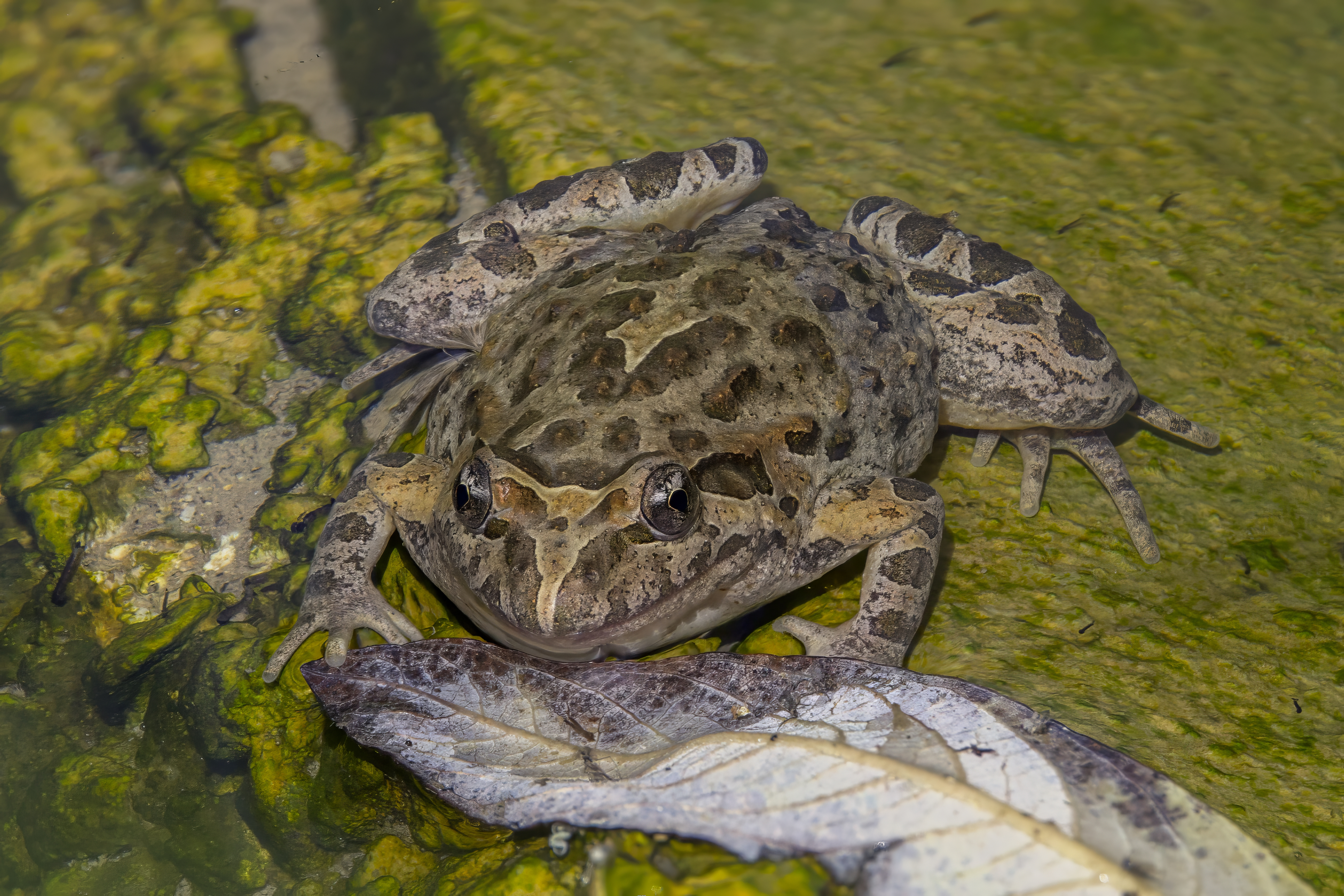
Mediterranean painted frog

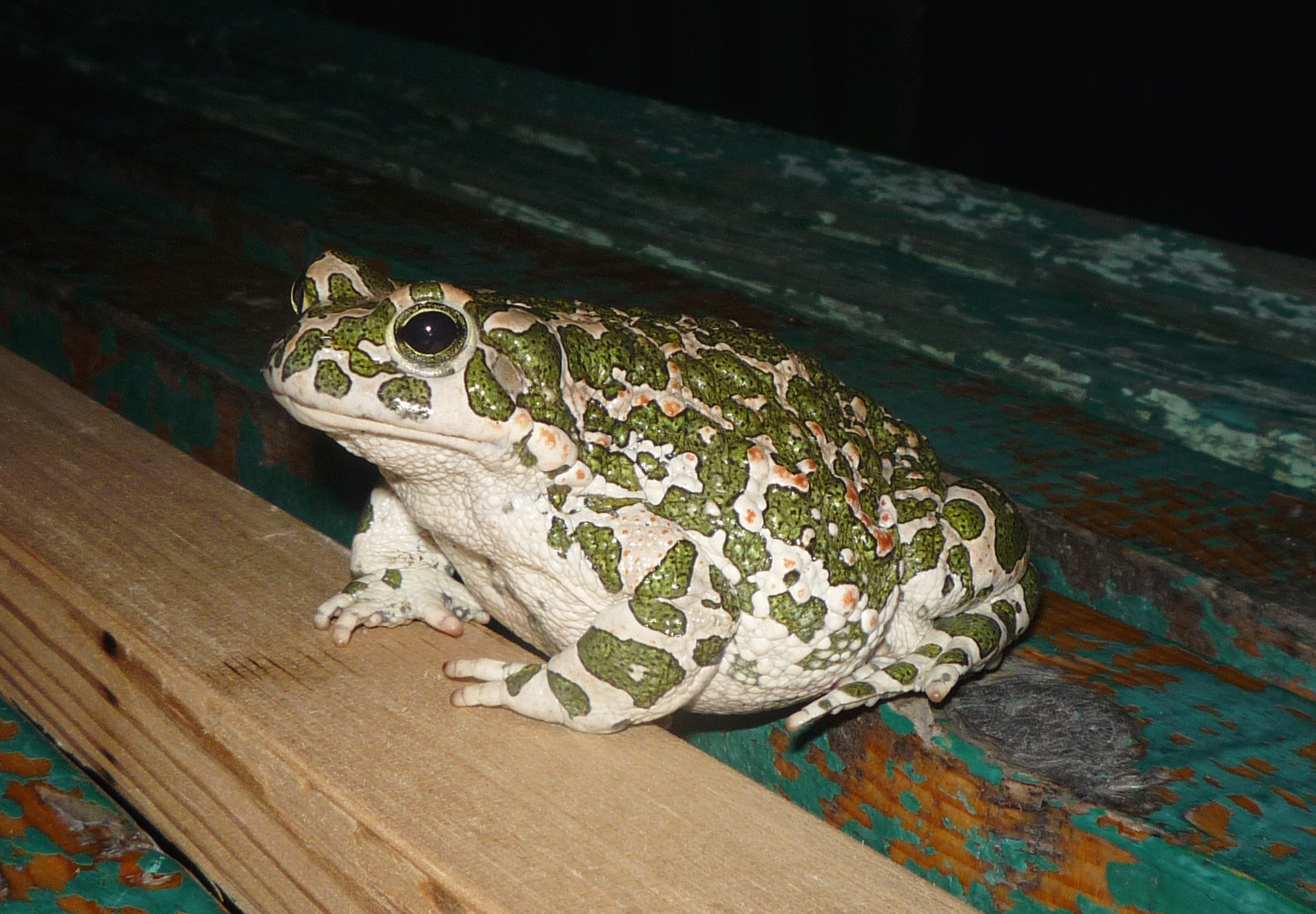
European green toad

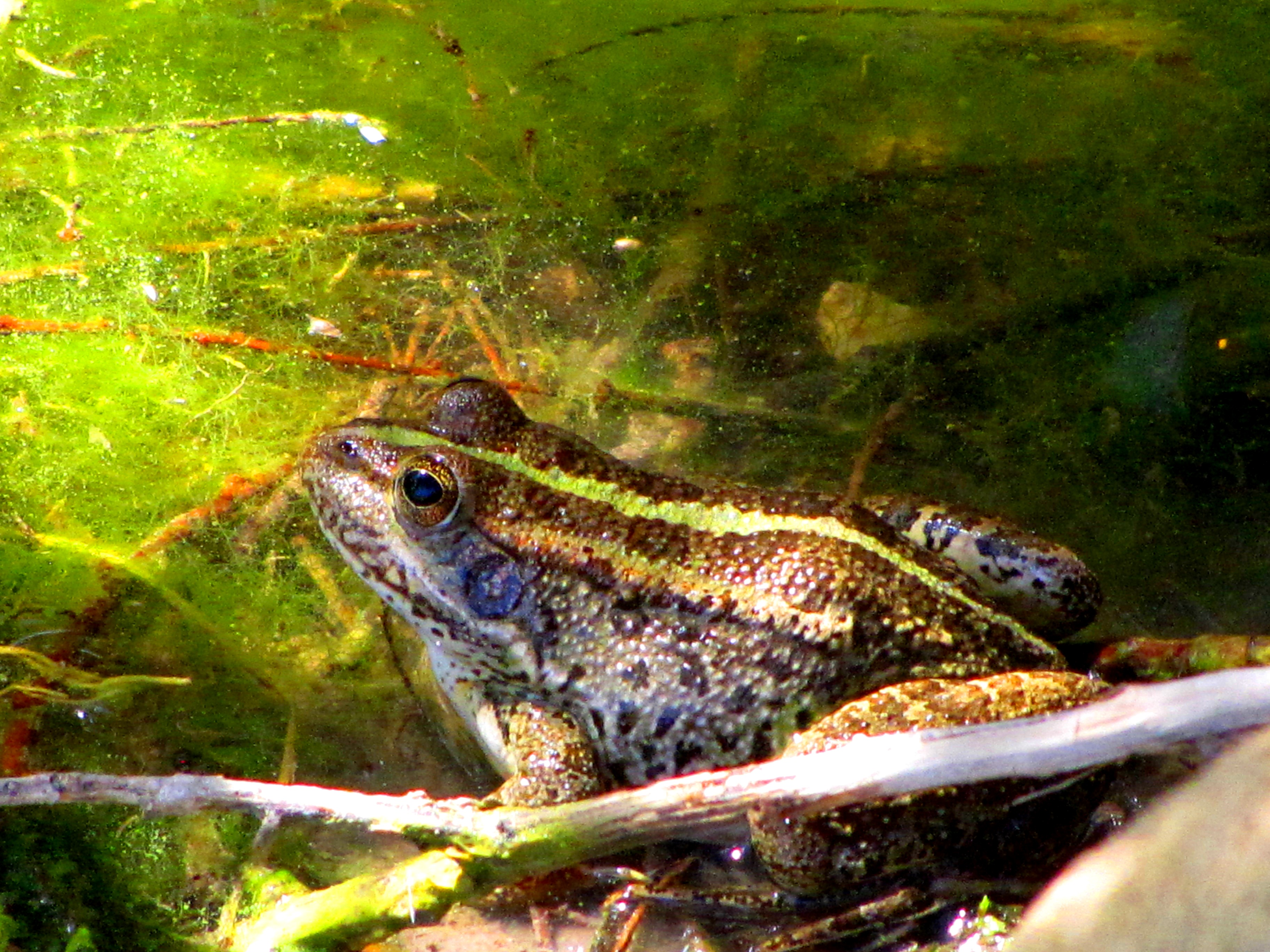
Levant water frog

Endemic to the islands of Malta and Sicily, the Mediterranean painted frog is the only naturally occurring amphibian in the Maltese Islands.

There are three species of amphibians in Malta.

== Subclass: Lissamphibia ==
=== Superorder: Salientia ===
==== Order: Anura ====
- Suborder: Neobatrachia
  - Family: Alytidae
    - Genus: Discoglossus
      - Mediterranean painted frog (Discoglossus pictus) LC
  - Family: Bufonidae
    - Genus: Bufotes
      - European green toad (Bufotes viridis) LC
  - Family: Ranidae
    - Genus: Pelophylax
      - Levant water frog (Pelophylax bedriagae) LC
