= List of amphibians and reptiles of Sweden =

Sweden is home to thirteen species of amphibians and six species of reptiles. All nineteen species are protected throughout the country.

== Amphibians ==
Scientific name	Common name Swedish name	Description	Image	Notes
Bombina bombina	European fire-bellied toad Klockgroda			
Bufo bufo	Common toad Vanlig padda	Adults are about 15 centimetres (6 in) long and colored brown, olive-brown or greyish brown.		
Bufotes viridis	European green toad Grönfläckig padda			
Epidalea calamita	Natterjack toad Strandpadda/Stinkpadda			
Hyla arborea	European tree frog Lövgroda			
Pelobates fuscus	Common spadefoot Lökgroda			
Pelophylax kl. esculentus	Edible frog Ätlig groda	Female adults are 5 to 9 centimetres (2 to 4 in) long and males are 6 to 11 centimetres (2 to 4 in) long.		It is a fertile hybrid of the pool frog and the marsh frog.
Pelophylax lessonae	Pool frog Gölgroda			
Rana arvalis	Moor frog Åkergroda			
Rana dalmatina	Agile frog Långbensgroda			
Rana temporaria	Common frog Vanlig groda	Adults are about 6 to 9 centimetres (2.4 to 3.5 in) long. They and colored olive green, grey-brown, brown, olive-brown, grey, yellowish or rufous.		
Triturus cristatus	Great crested newt Större vattensalamander			
Lissotriton vulgaris	Smooth newt Mindre vattensalamander			

== Reptiles ==
Scientific name	Common name Swedish name	Description	Image	Notes
Anguis fragilis	Slowworm; Kopparödla			
Coronella austriaca	Smooth snake Hasselsnok			
Lacerta agilis	Sand lizard Sandödla			
Natrix natrix (incl. Natrix natrix gotlandica)	Grass snake Snok (Gotlandssnok)			
Vipera berus	Common European adder Huggorm			
Zootoca vivipara	Viviparous lizard Skogsödla			
