= List of mammals of Cyprus =

This is a list of the mammal species recorded in Cyprus. There are seventeen mammal species native to Cyprus, excluding feral species. Most of the land mammals have been introduced. The other mammal species present on the islands during the Late Pleistocene, including the Cyprus dwarf hippopotamus, the Cyprus dwarf elephant, and Cyprus genet, are extinct.

Icons which state each species' global IUCN status:
VU	Vulnerable	Facing a high risk of extinction in the wild
NT	Near Threatened	Doesn't meet any criteria that would categorise it as risking extinction but likely to in the future
LC	Least Concern	No current identifiable risks to this species
DD	Data Deficient	Inadequate information to make an assessment of the risks to this species

== Order: Lagomorpha (rabbits and hares) ==
Despite their appearance, lagomorphs are not rodents, and fall in their own order. They consist of rabbits, hares, and pikas.

- Family: Leporidae
  - Genus: Lepus
    - Cape hare, L. capensis LC

== Order: Rodentia (rodents) ==
Rodents make up the largest order of mammals, with over 40% of mammalian species. They have two incisors in the upper and lower jaw which grow continually and must be kept short by gnawing. Most rodents are small though the capybara can weigh up to 45 kg (99 lb).

- Suborder: Sciurognathi
  - Family: Muridae (mice, rats, voles, gerbils, hamsters, etc.)
    - Subfamily: Deomyinae
      - Genus: Acomys
        - Cyprus spiny mouse, A. nesiotes LC
    - Subfamily: Murinae
      - Genus: Mus
        - Cypriot mouse, M. cypriacus DD
        - House mouse, M. musculus LC introduced
      - Genus: Rattus
        - Brown rat, R. norvegicus LC introduced
        - Black rat, R. rattus LC introduced

== Order: Eulipotyphla (hedgehogs, shrews and moles) ==
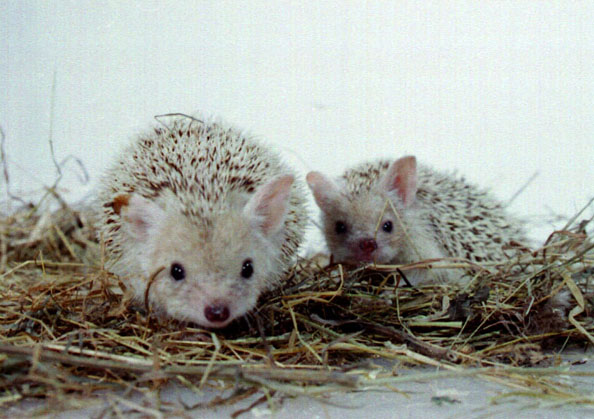
Long-eared hedgehog

Hedgehogs are easily recognised by their spines, shrews closely resemble mice, and moles are stout-bodied burrowers.

- Family: Erinaceidae (hedgehogs)
  - Subfamily: Erinaceinae
    - Genus: Hemiechinus
      - Long-eared hedgehog, H. auritus LC
- Family: Soricidae (shrews)
  - Subfamily: Crocidurinae
    - Genus: Crocidura
      - Lesser white-toothed shrew, C. suaveolens LC introduced
      - Güldenstädt's shrew, C. gueldenstaedtii LC
    - Genus: Suncus
      - Etruscan shrew, S. etruscus LC

== Order: Chiroptera (bats) ==
The bats' most distinguishing feature is that their forelimbs are developed as wings, making them the only mammals capable of flight. Bat species account for about 20% of all mammals.

- Family: Pteropodidae (flying foxes, Old World fruit bats)
  - Subfamily: Pteropodinae
    - Genus: Rousettus
      - Egyptian fruit bat, R. aegyptiacus LC
- Family: Vespertilionidae
  - Subfamily: Miniopterinae
    - Genus: Miniopterus
      - Common bent-wing bat, M. schreibersii VU
  - Subfamily: Myotinae
    - Genus: Myotis
      - Greater mouse-eared bat, M. myotis LC
  - Subfamily: Vespertilioninae
    - Genus: Pipistrellus
      - Common pipistrelle, P. pipistrellus LC
    - Genus: Plecotus
      - Grey long-eared bat, P. austriacus NT
- Family: Rhinolophidae
  - Subfamily: Rhinolophinae
    - Genus: Rhinolophus
      - Blasius's horseshoe bat, R. blasii LC
      - Mediterranean horseshoe bat, R. euryale NT
      - Greater horseshoe bat, R. ferrumequinum LC

== Order: Cetacea (whales) ==
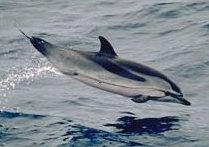
Striped dolphin

The order Cetacea includes whales, dolphins and porpoises. They are the mammals most fully adapted to aquatic life with a spindle-shaped nearly hairless body, protected by a thick layer of blubber, and forelimbs and tail modified to provide propulsion underwater.

Species listed below also includes species being recorded in Levantine Sea.

- Suborder: Mysticeti
  - Family: Balaenopteridae
    - Genus: Balaenoptera
      - Common minke whale, B. acutorostrata LC
      - Fin whale, B. physalus VU
- Subfamily: Megapterinae
  - Genus: Megaptera
    - Humpback whale, M. novaeangliae LC
- Suborder: Odontoceti
  - Family: Physeteridae
    - Genus: Physeter
      - Sperm whale, P. macrocephalus VU
  - Family: Ziphidae
    - Genus: Mesoplodon
      - Gervais' beaked whale, M. europaeus LC
    - Genus: Ziphius
      - Cuvier's beaked whale, Z. cavirostris LC
  - Superfamily: Platanistoidea
    - Family: Delphinidae (marine dolphins)
      - Genus: Delphinus
        - Short-beaked common dolphin, D. delphis LC
      - Genus: Globicephala
        - Long-finned pilot whale, G. melas LC
      - Genus: Grampus
        - Risso's dolphin, G. griseus LC
      - Genus: Orcinus
        - Orca, O. orca DD
      - Genus: Pseudorca
        - False killer whale, P. crassidens NT
      - Genus: Stenella
        - Striped dolphin, S. coeruleoalba LC
      - Genus: Steno
        - Rough-toothed dolphin, S. bredanensis LC
      - Genus: Tursiops
        - Common bottlenose dolphin, T. truncatus LC

== Order: Carnivora (carnivorans) ==
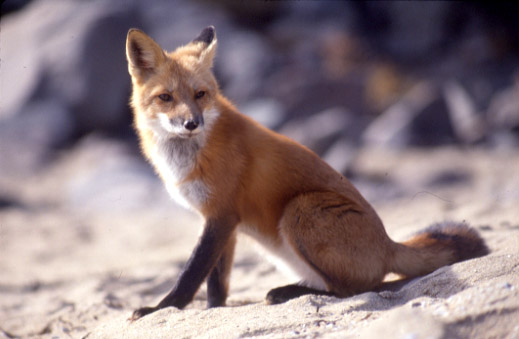
Red fox

There are over 260 species of carnivorans, the majority of which feed primarily on meat. They have a characteristic skull shape and dentition.

- Suborder: Caniformia
  - Family: Canidae (dogs, foxes)
    - Genus: Vulpes
      - Red fox, V. vulpes LC
        - Cypriot red fox, V. v. indutus
  - Family: Phocidae (earless seals)
    - Genus: Monachus
      - Mediterranean monk seal, M. monachus VU

== Order: Artiodactyla (even-toed ungulates) ==
The even-toed ungulates are ungulates whose weight is borne about equally by the third and fourth toes, rather than mostly or entirely by the third as in perissodactyls. There are about 220 artiodactyl species, including many that are of great economic importance to humans.

- Family: Bovidae (cattle, antelope, sheep, goats)
  - Subfamily: Caprinae
    - Genus: Ovis
      - Mouflon, O. gmelini NT
        - Cyprus mouflon, O. g. ophion

== See also ==
- List of chordate orders
- Lists of mammals by region
- Mammal classification
