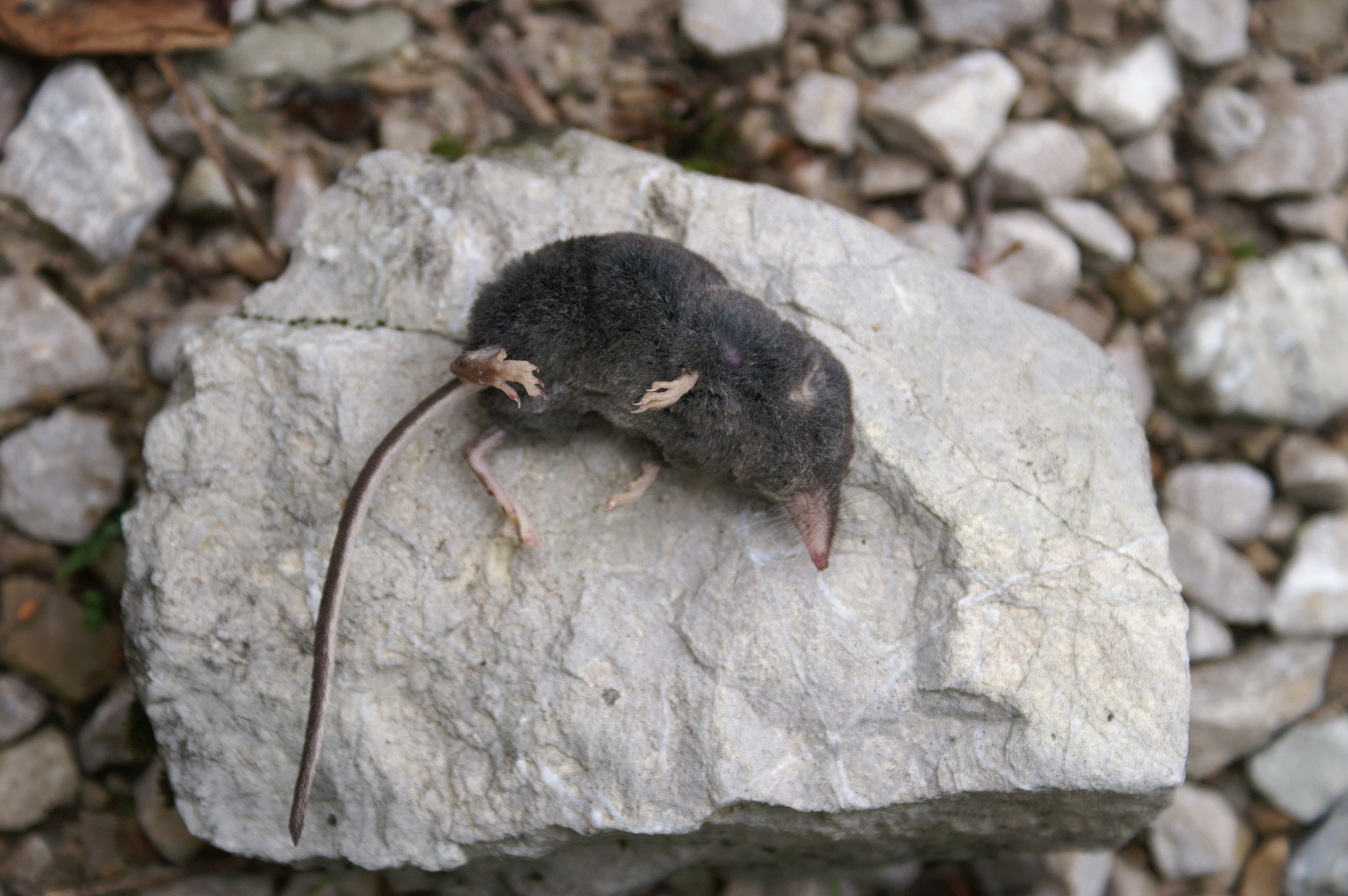

Conservation status
- Near Threatened (IUCN 3.1)

Scientific classification
- Kingdom: Animalia
- Phylum: Chordata
- Class: Mammalia
- Infraclass: Placentalia
- Order: Eulipotyphla
- Family: Soricidae
- Genus: Sorex
- Species: S. alpinus

Binomial name
- Sorex alpinus Schinz, 1837
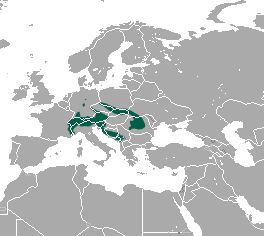
- Alpine Shrew range

= Alpine shrew =

Species of mammal

The alpine shrew (Sorex alpinus) is a species of mammal in the family Soricidae. It is found in the alpine meadows and coniferous forests of central and southern European mountain ranges.

== Description ==
The Alpine shrew is 6 to 7.7 centimetres (2.4 to 3.0 in) in length, not including a tail as long as its body, and weighs between 5.5 and 11.5 g (0.2 and 0.4 oz). It is a uniform greyish-black on its dorsal (upper) surface and greyish-brown on its underparts. The tips of its teeth are reddish-brown and it has a long pointed snout, small black eyes and rounded pink ears. Its legs and feet are white and the underside of its hairy tail is yellowish. Juveniles are somewhat paler than adults. It shares its range with the common shrew (S. araneus) and the Eurasian pygmy shrew (S. minutus) but is distinguishable from these by its darker fur and longer tail.

== Distribution and habitat ==
The Alpine shrew is found in the mountains and uplands of Central and Eastern Europe and parts of France. Its range includes the Alps, the Black Forest, the Jura Mountains, the mountains of southern Germany, the Giant Mountains, the Beskids, the Tatra Mountains, the Carpathian Mountains, the Transylvanian Alps, the uplands of Vosges and the mountains of the former Yugoslavia. The Alpine shrew is found in Alpine meadows and in coniferous woodland at elevations between about 200 and 2,500 metres (660 and 8,200 ft). It sometimes occurs above the tree line but more normally favours damp pastures and swampy ground near small streams in areas with dwarf sparse conifers near the upper limit of tree cover. It tends to lurk in dense vegetation, occupies rock crevices and lives under boulders or fallen branches and often occurs near mountain huts.

The Alpine shrew was recorded in the Spanish Pyrenees in the early 20th century. It is presumed locally extinct due to the lack of modern sightings.

== Behaviour ==
The Alpine shrew is nocturnal and is a skilled climber, using its tail for balance. It uses scent glands on its flanks to mark its territory. Like other shrew species, it has a high metabolic rate and needs to feed frequently. It eats insects, spiders, snails and earthworms and is in turn the prey of foxes, weasels, domestic cats and tawny owls.

== Status ==
The Alpine shrew is listed as "Near Threatened" in the IUCN's Red List of Threatened Species. This is because it occupies a number of separate, disjunct mountain regions and seems to be slowly declining in numbers. It may be threatened by habitat destruction as hydro-electric schemes and increased tourism impact its environment. It used to be present in the Pyrenees but has not been seen there for many years and may be extinct there, nor has it been seen recently in the Harz Mountain region of Germany.
