= List of reptiles of Malta =

List of Reptiles

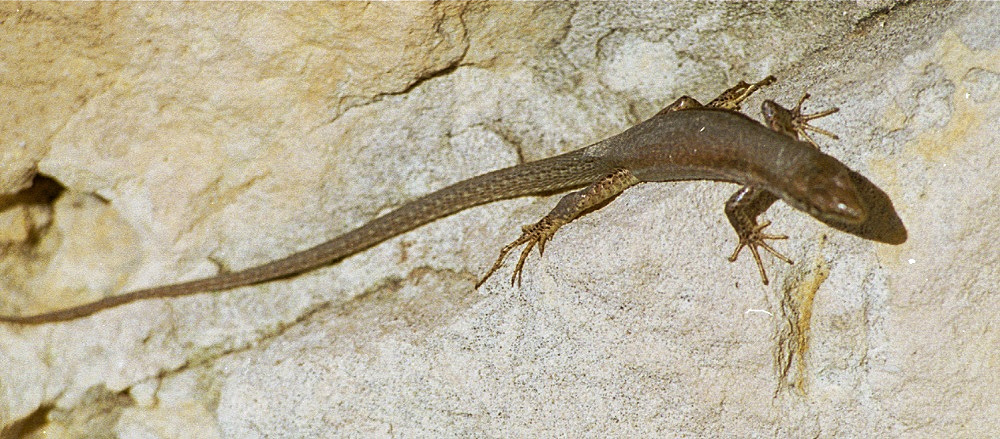
Maltese wall lizard

The only native reptile indigenous to Malta is the Filfola lizard, also known as the Maltese wall lizard. It is also endemic to Italy, specifically the Pelagian Islands.

== Clade: Sauria ==
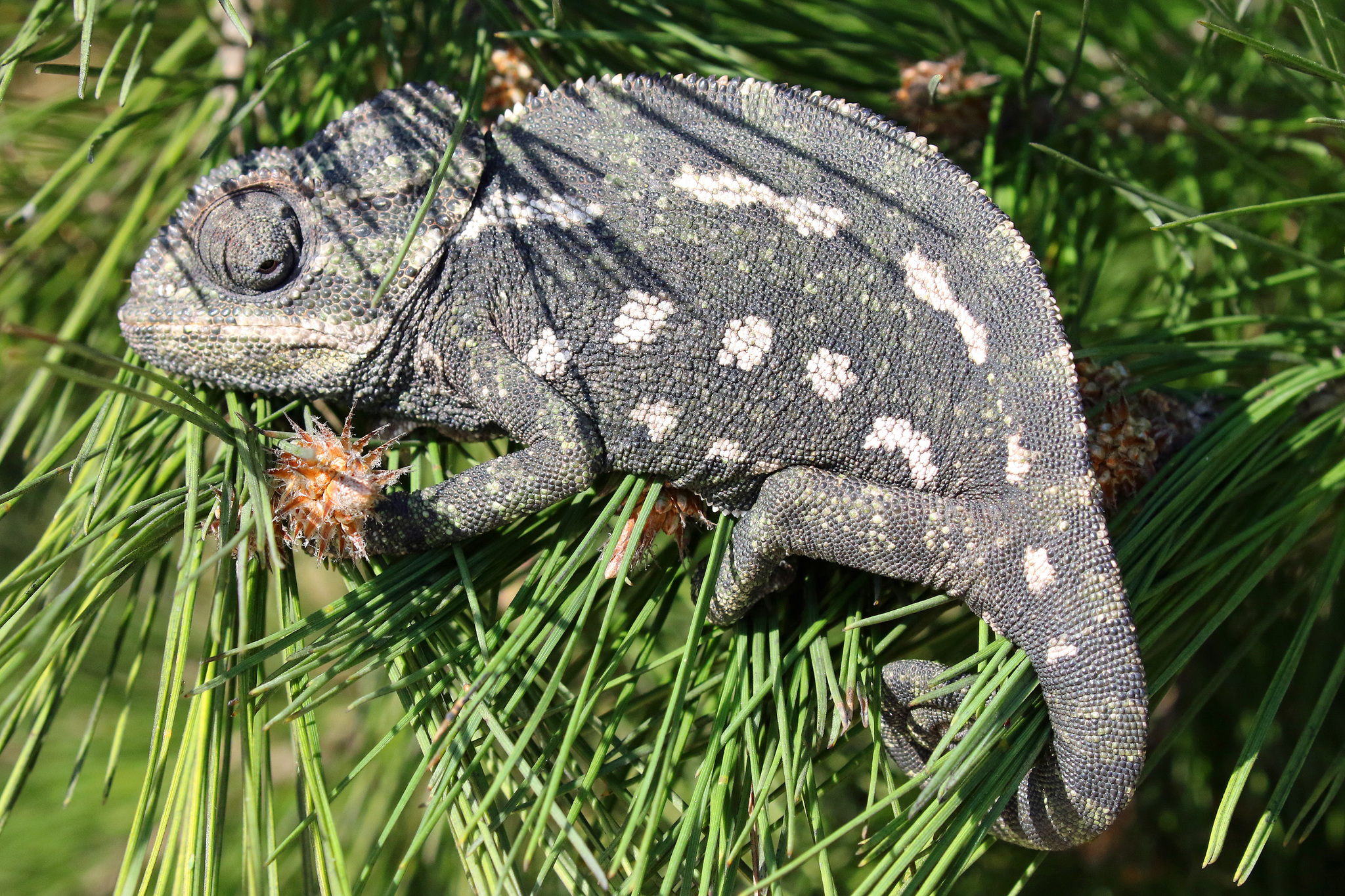
Common chamaeleon, also called the mediterranean chamaeleon

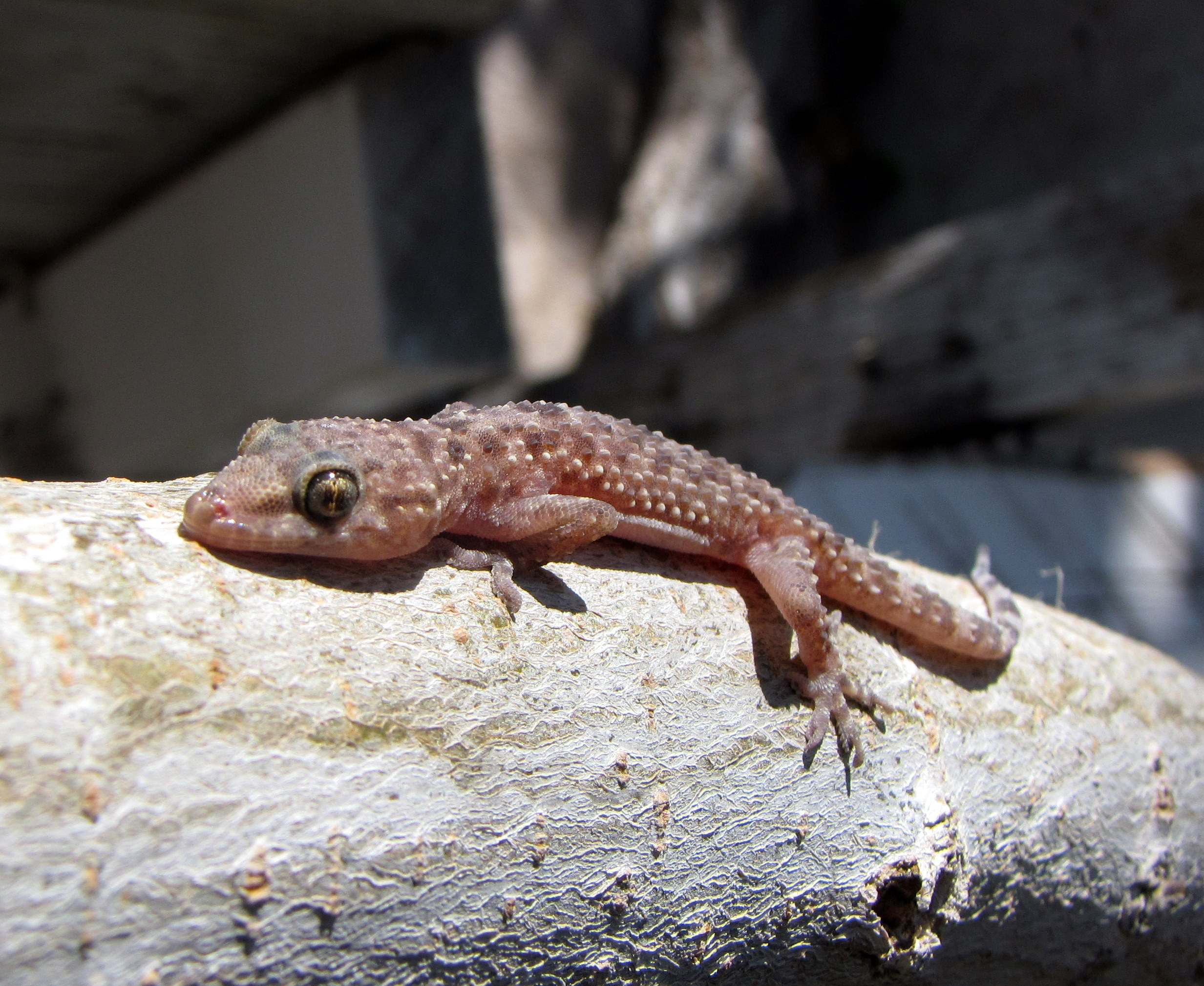
Mediterranean house gecko

=== Order: Squamata ===
- Suborder: Gekkotta
  - Family: Gekkonidae
    - Genus: Hemidactylus
      - Mediterranean house gecko (Hemidactylus turcicus) LC
  - Family: Lacertidae
    - Genus: Podarcis
      - Maltese wall lizard (Podarcis filfolensis) LC
  - Family: Phyllodactylidae
    - Genus: Tarentola
      - Moorish wall gecko (Tarentola mauritanica) LC
  - Family: Scincidae
    - Genus: Chalcides
      - Mediterranean ocellated skink (Chalcides ocellatus) LC
  - Family: Chamaeleonidae
    - Genus: Chamaeleo
      - Mediterranean Chameleon (Chamaeleo chamaeleon) LC
- Suborder: Serpentes
  - Family: Colubridae
    - Genus: Hierophis
      - Algerian whip snake (Hierophis algirus) LC
      - European black whip snake (Hierophis carbonarius) LC
      - Western whip snake (Hierophis viridiflavus) LC
    - Genus: Zamenis
      - Leopard snake (Zamenis situla) LC

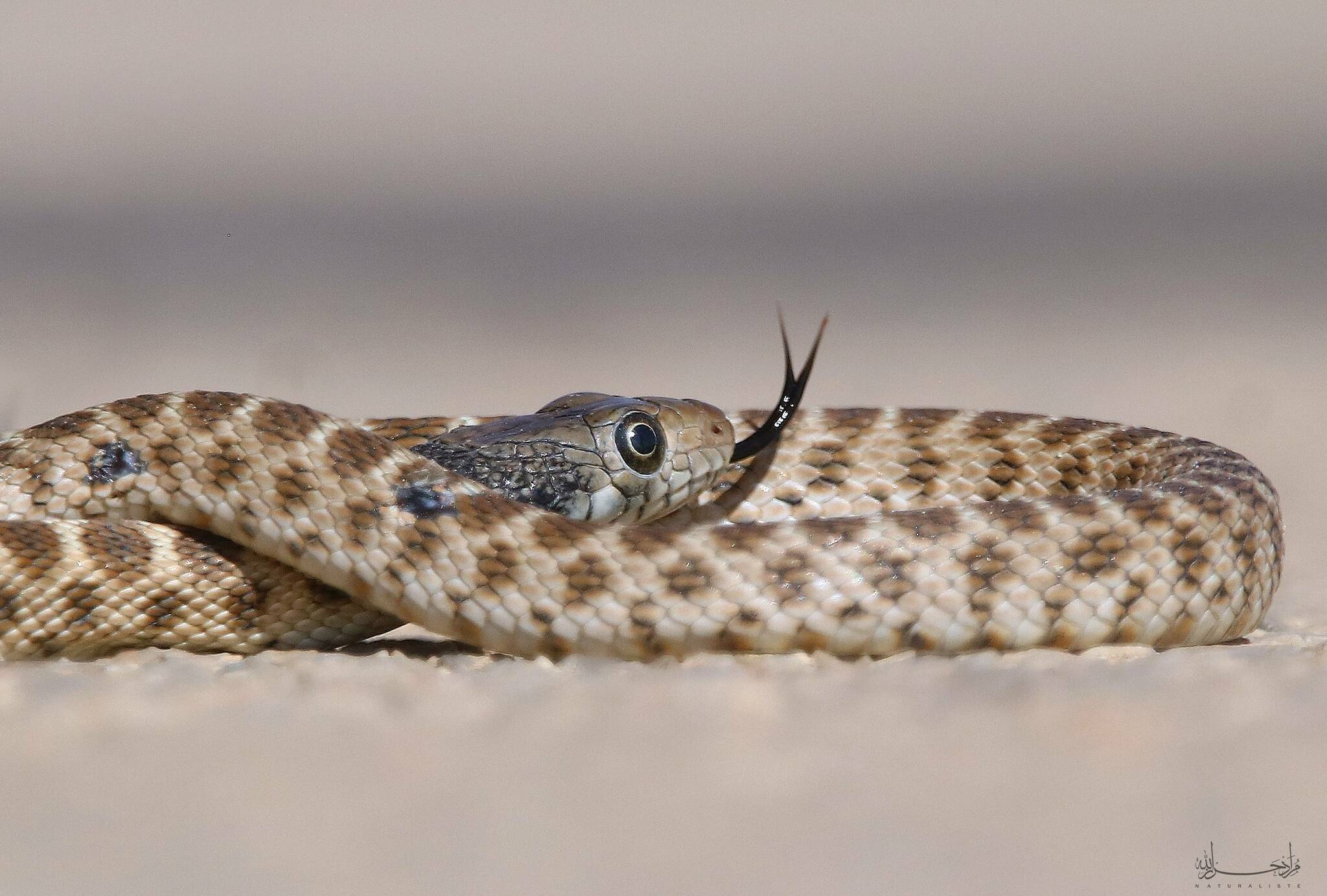
Algerian whip snake

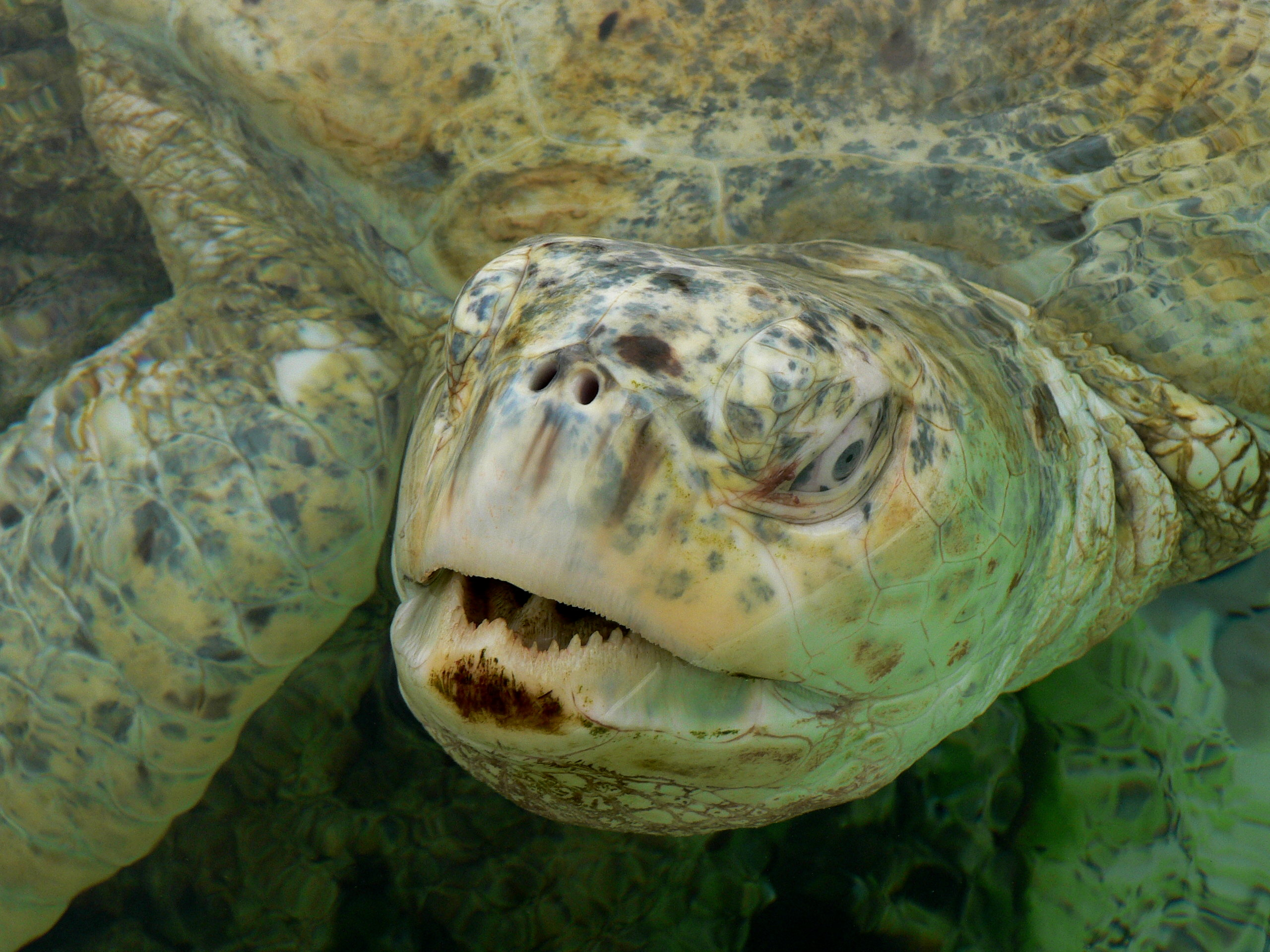
Green sea turtle

Order: Testudines

- Suborder: Cryptodira
  - Family: Cheloniidae
    - Genus: Caretta
      - Loggerhead sea turtle (Caretta caretta) LC
    - Genus: Chelonia
      - Green sea turtle (Chelonia mydas) LC
    - Genus: Eretmochelys
      - Hawksbill sea turtle (Dermochelys coriacea )LC
  - Family: Emydidae
    - Genus: Graptemys
      - False map turtle (Graptemys pseudogeographica) LC
    - Genus: Trachemys
      - Species: T. scripta LC
        - Subspecies: Red-eared slider (Trachemys scripta elegans)
