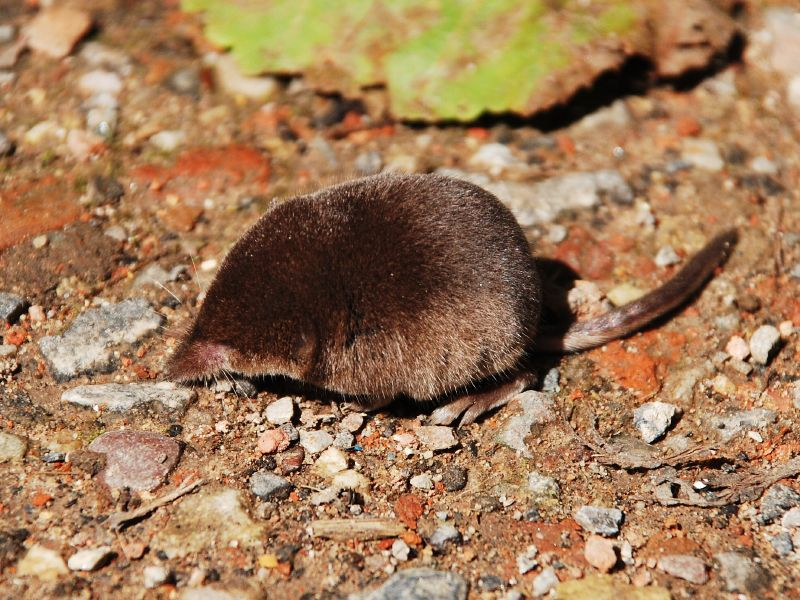
- Eurasian pygmy shrew in the wild in Sheffield, England

Conservation status
- Least Concern (IUCN 3.1)

Scientific classification
- Kingdom: Animalia
- Phylum: Chordata
- Class: Mammalia
- Infraclass: Placentalia
- Order: Eulipotyphla
- Family: Soricidae
- Genus: Sorex
- Species: S. minutus

Binomial name
- Sorex minutus Linnaeus, 1766
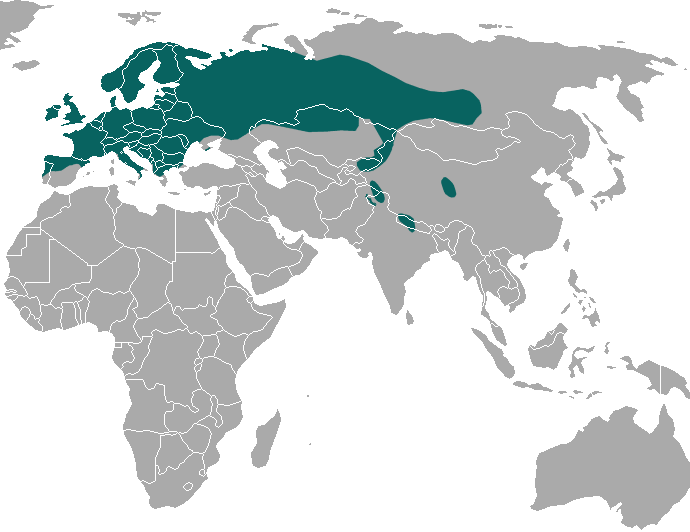
- Eurasian pygmy shrew range

= Eurasian pygmy shrew =

Eurasian pygmy shrew Temporal range: Early Middle Pleistocene–Recent

Species of mammal

The Eurasian pygmy shrew (Sorex minutus), often known simply as the pygmy shrew, is a widespread shrew of the northern Palearctic.

== Description ==
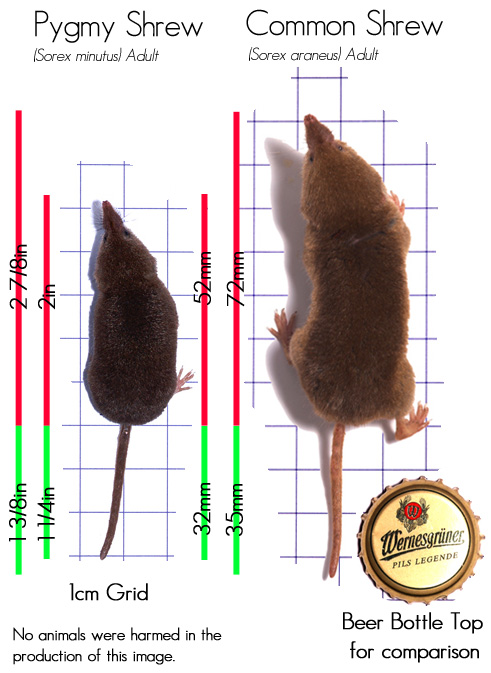
Size comparison between the Common shrew and the Eurasian pygmy shrew (both genus Sorex)

The Eurasian pygmy shrew measures about 5 cm (2.0 in) in length, plus a 3.5 cm (1.4 in) long tail; it has an average weight of 4 g (0.14 oz). The very dense and shiny fur on its back is blackish with shades ranging from reddish to purplish; the belly, throat, jaw, periocular area and lower part of the tail are contrasted whitish. The muzzle and legs are covered with sparse white hair, while the skin is flesh coloured. The ears are small and half hidden by fur, they are dark flesh colored and shaped like a semicircle. The head is larger in proportion to the body than in other shrews.

== Behaviour and ecology ==
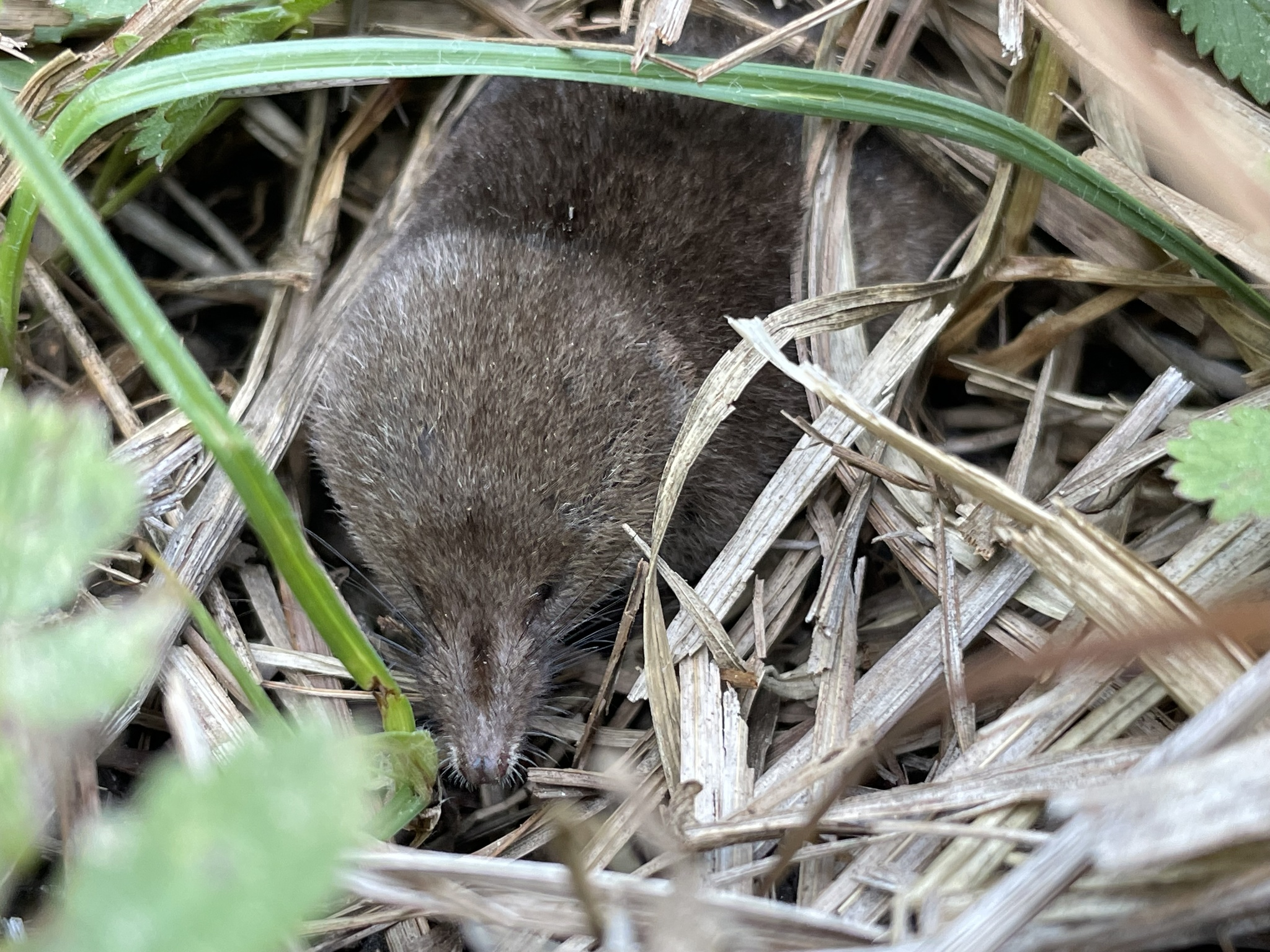
Close-up of a Eurasian pygmy shrew in Sila National Park, Italy

The Eurasian pygmy shrew is a solitary mammal, active throughout the day and night and inhabiting areas of dense vegetation across a broad elevation range. It lives of seeds, small insects and other invertebrates. It uses the burrows or tunnels of other rodents under tree stumps. It roams on a few hundred square metres and establishes trackways. It has one of the highest metabolic rates of any animal; to maintain homeostasis, it must eat every two hours. Due to this, it eats up to 125% of its body weight, about 4 g (0.14 oz) each day.

=== Breeding ===
The breeding season lasts from April through to August. Females usually produce between two and eight young per litter and care for the young in an underground nest. Since the gestation period is just over three weeks, they can have up to five litters in one year, though the life span of a pygmy shrew is a little over 15 months.
