= List of mammals of Belarus =

There are forty-eight mammal species in Belarus. One of the species listed for Belarus can no longer be found in the wild. This list is derived from the IUCN Red List which lists species of mammals and includes those mammals that have recently been classified as extinct (since 1500 AD).

Icons which state each species' global IUCN status:
CR	Critically Endangered	In imminent risk of extinction in the wild
EN	Endangered	Facing an extremely high risk of extinction in the wild
VU	Vulnerable	Facing a high risk of extinction in the wild
NT	Near Threatened	Doesn't meet any criteria that would categorise it as risking extinction but likely to in the future
LC	Least Concern	No current identifiable risks to this species

== Order: Rodentia (rodents) ==
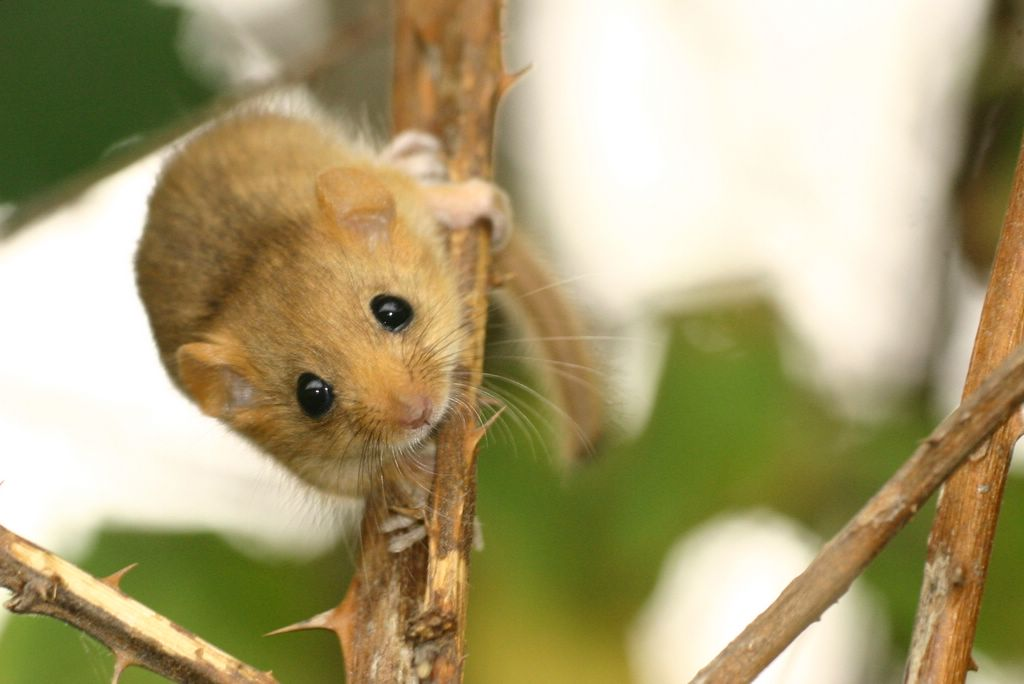
Hazel dormouse

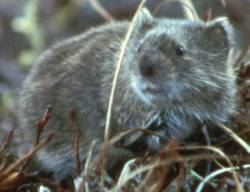
Tundra vole

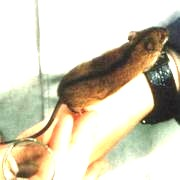
Striped field mouse

Rodents make up the largest order of mammals, with over 40% of mammalian species. They have two incisors in the upper and lower jaw which grow continually and must be kept short by gnawing. Most rodents are small though the capybara can weigh up to 45 kg (100 lb).

- Suborder: Sciurognathi
  - Family: Castoridae (beavers)
    - Genus: Castor
      - Eurasian beaver, C. fiber LC
  - Family: Sciuridae (squirrels)
    - Subfamily: Sciurinae
      - Tribe: Pteromyini
        - Genus: Pteromys
          - Siberian flying squirrel, P. volans LC possibly extirpated
  - Family: Gliridae (dormice)
    - Subfamily: Leithiinae
      - Genus: Dryomys
        - Forest dormouse, D. nitedula LC
      - Genus: Muscardinus
        - Hazel dormouse, M. avellanarius LC
    - Subfamily: Glirinae
      - Genus: Glis
        - European edible dormouse, G. glis LC
  - Family: Cricetidae
    - Subfamily: Arvicolinae
      - Genus: Arvicola
        - European water vole, A. amphibius LC
      - Genus: Clethrionomys
        - Bank vole, C. glareolus LC
      - Genus: Microtus
        - Field vole, M. agrestis LC
        - Common vole, M. arvalis LC
        - Tundra vole, M. oeconomus LC
  - Family: Muridae (mice, rats, voles, gerbils, hamsters, etc.)
    - Subfamily: Murinae
      - Genus: Apodemus
        - Striped field mouse, A. agrarius LC
        - Yellow-necked mouse, A. flavicollis LC
        - Wood mouse, A. sylvaticus LC
        - Ural field mouse, A. uralensis LC
      - Genus: Micromys
        - Eurasian harvest mouse, M. minutus LC

== Order: Lagomorpha (lagomorphs) ==
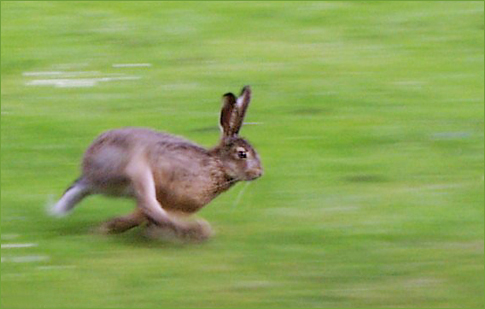
European hare

The lagomorphs comprise two families, Leporidae (hares and rabbits), and Ochotonidae (pikas). Though they can resemble rodents, and were classified as a superfamily in that order until the early twentieth century, they have since been considered a separate order. They differ from rodents in a number of physical characteristics, such as having four incisors in the upper jaw rather than two.

- Family: Leporidae (rabbits, hares)
  - Genus: Lepus
    - European hare, L. europaeus LC
    - Mountain hare, L. timidus LC

== Order: Eulipotyphla (hedgehogs, shrews and moles) ==
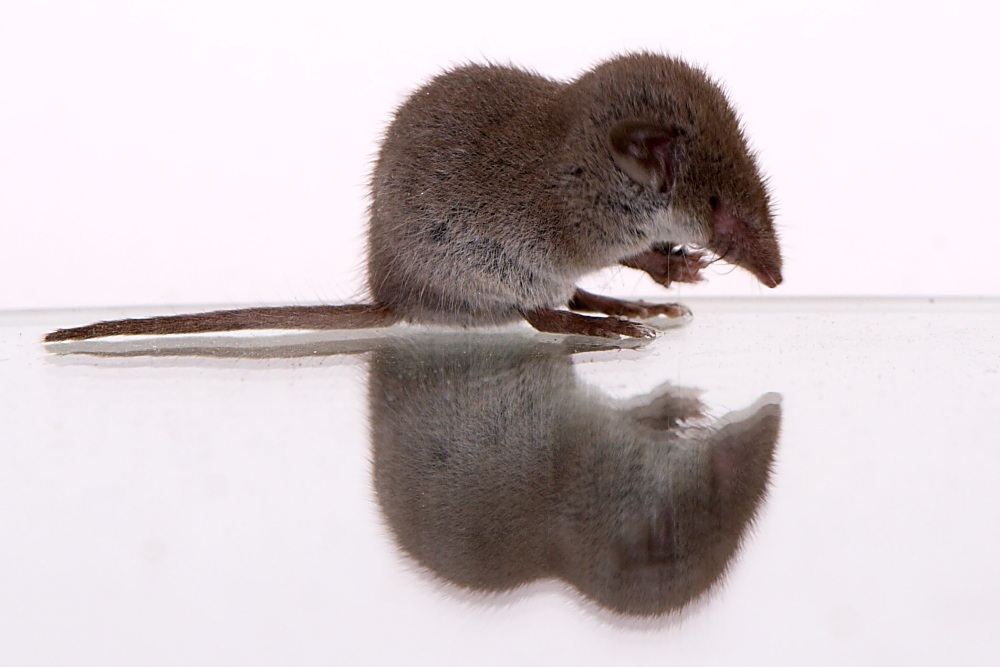
Lesser white-toothed shrew

Hedgehogs are easily recognised by their spines, shrews closely resemble mice, and moles are stout-bodied burrowers.

- Family: Erinaceidae (hedgehogs)
  - Subfamily: Erinaceinae
    - Genus: Erinaceus
      - Southern white-breasted hedgehog, E. concolor LC
      - Northern white-breasted hedgehog, E. roumanicus LC
- Family: Soricidae (shrews)
  - Subfamily: Crocidurinae
    - Genus: Crocidura
      - Lesser white-toothed shrew, C. suaveolens LC
  - Subfamily: Soricinae
    - Tribe: Nectogalini
      - Genus: Neomys
        - Eurasian water shrew, Neomys fodiens LC
    - Tribe: Soricini
      - Genus: Sorex
        - Laxmann's shrew, Sorex caecutiens LC
        - Eurasian pygmy shrew, Sorex minutus LC
- Family: Talpidae (moles)
  - Subfamily: Talpinae
    - Tribe: Desmanini
      - Genus: Desmana
        - Russian desman, D. moschata CR extirpated

== Order: Chiroptera (bats) ==
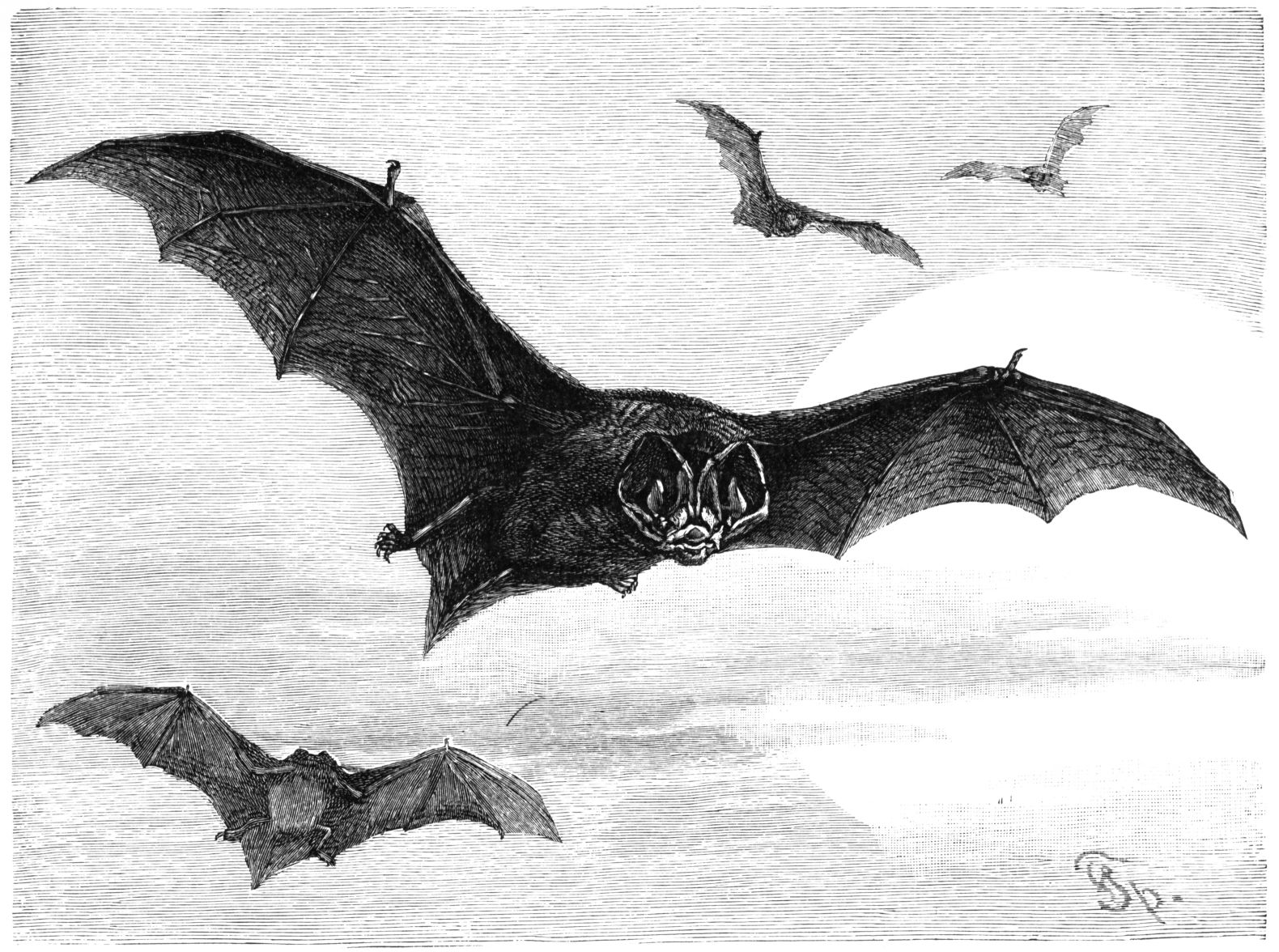
Barbastelle

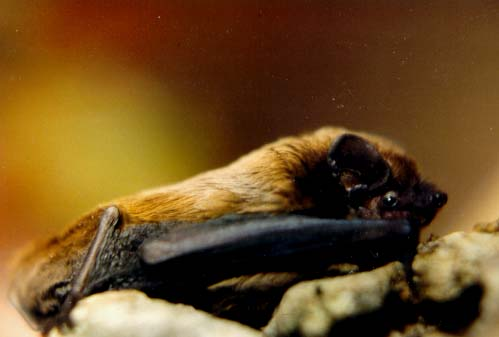
Lesser noctule

The bats' most distinguishing feature is that their forelimbs are developed as wings, making them the only mammals capable of flight. Bat species account for about 20% of all mammals.

- Family: Vespertilionidae
  - Subfamily: Myotinae
    - Genus: Myotis
      - Bechstein's bat, M. bechsteini NT
      - Pond bat, M. dasycneme NT
      - Greater mouse-eared bat, M. myotis LC
      - Natterer's bat, Myotis nattereri LC
  - Subfamily: Vespertilioninae
    - Genus: Barbastella
      - Western barbastelle, B. barbastellus NT
    - Genus: Nyctalus
      - Greater noctule bat, N. lasiopterus VU
      - Lesser noctule, N. leisleri LC

== Order: Carnivora (carnivorans) ==
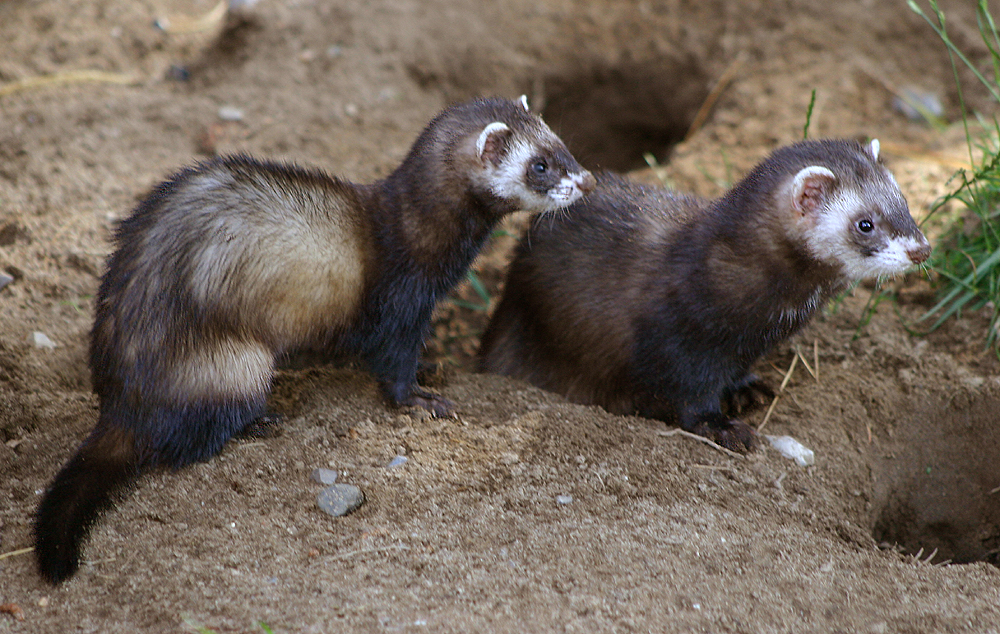
European polecat

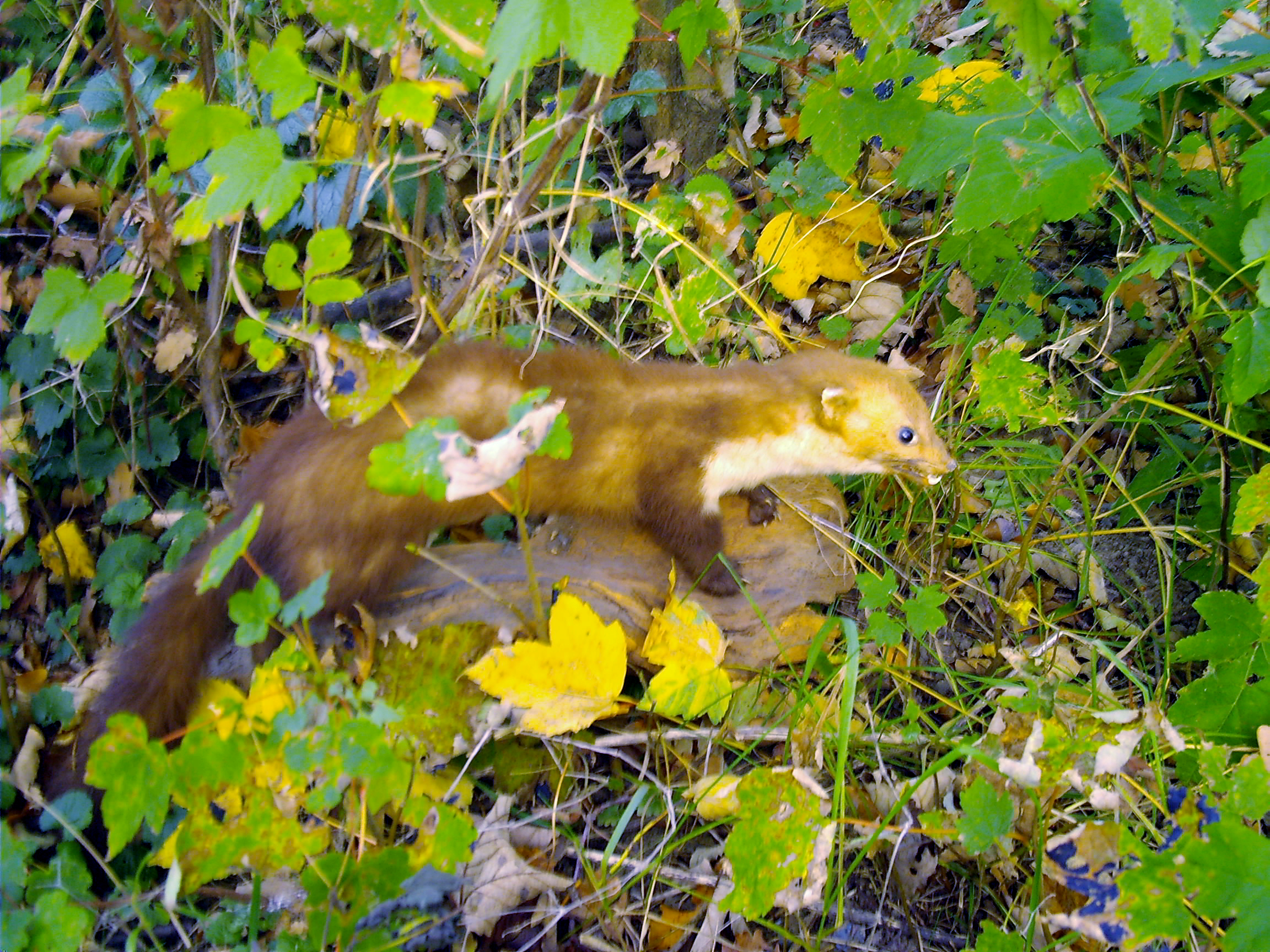
Beech marten

There are over 260 species of carnivorans, the majority of which feed primarily on meat. They have a characteristic skull shape and dentition.

- Suborder: Feliformia
  - Family: Felidae (cats)
    - Subfamily: Felinae
      - Genus: Felis
        - European wildcat, F. silvestris LC
      - Genus: Lynx
        - Eurasian lynx, L. lynx LC
- Suborder: Caniformia
  - Family: Canidae (dogs, foxes)
    - Genus: Vulpes
      - Red fox, V. vulpes LC
    - Genus: Canis
      - Gray wolf, C. lupus LC
        - Eurasian wolf, C. l. lupus
  - Family: Ursidae (bears)
    - Genus: Ursus
      - Brown bear, U. arctos LC
        - Eurasian brown bear, U. a. arctos
  - Family: Mustelidae (mustelids)
    - Genus: Lutra
      - Eurasian otter, L. lutra NT
    - Genus: Martes
      - Beech marten, M. foina LC
    - Genus: Meles
      - European badger, M. meles LC
    - Genus: Mustela
      - Stoat, M. erminea LC
      - Steppe polecat, M. eversmannii LC
      - European mink, M. lutreola CR extirpated
      - Least weasel, M. nivalis LC
      - European polecat, M. putorius LC
    - Genus: Neogale
      - American mink, N. vison LC introduced

== Order: Perissodactyla (odd-toed ungulates) ==
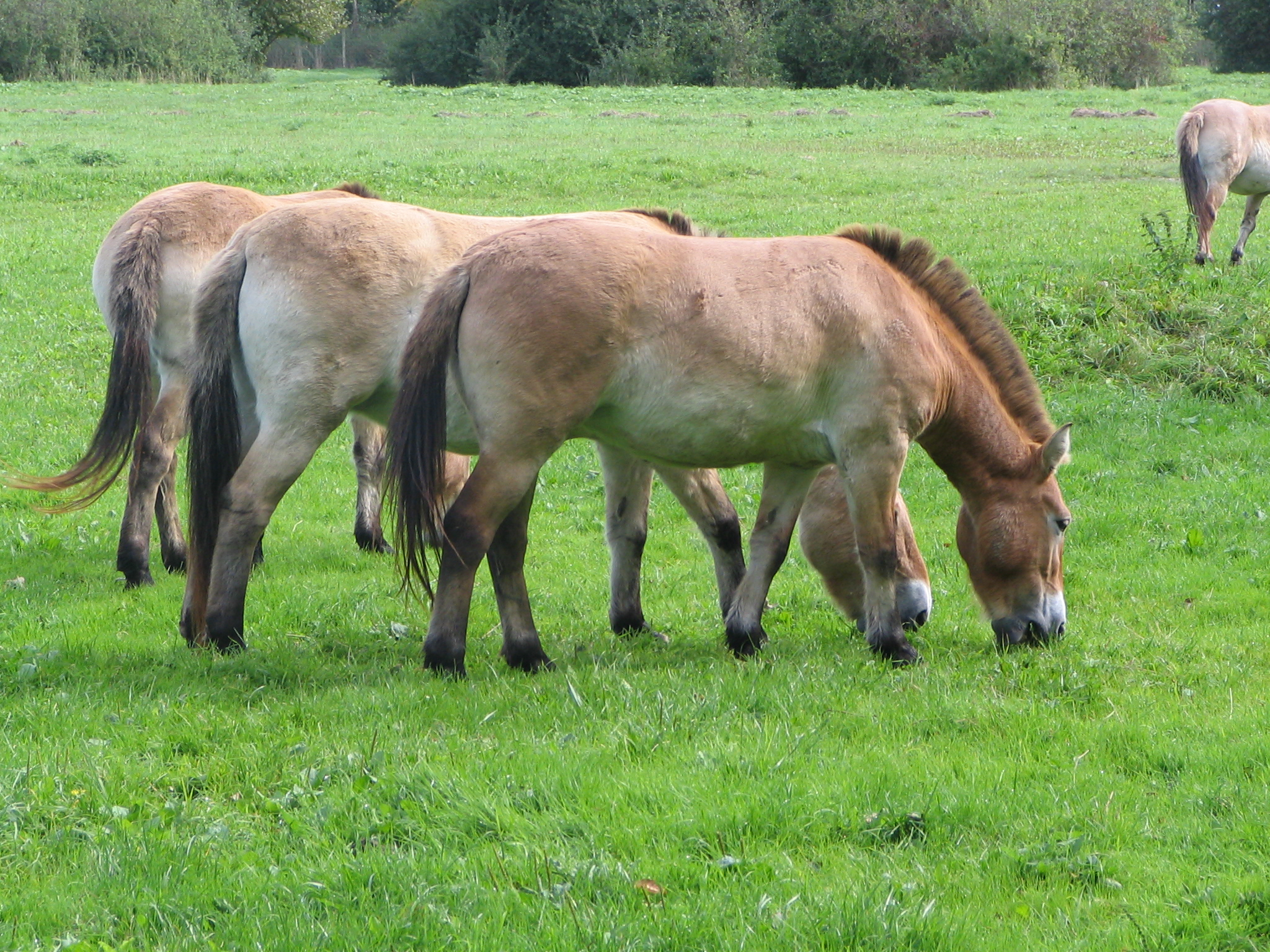
Przewalski's horse

The odd-toed ungulates are browsing and grazing mammals. They are usually large to very large, and have relatively simple stomachs and a large middle toe.

- Family: Equidae (horses etc.)
  - Genus: Equus
    - Wild horse, E. ferus EN reintroduced
      - Przewalski's horse, E. f. przewalskii EN reintroduced

== Order: Artiodactyla (even-toed ungulates) ==
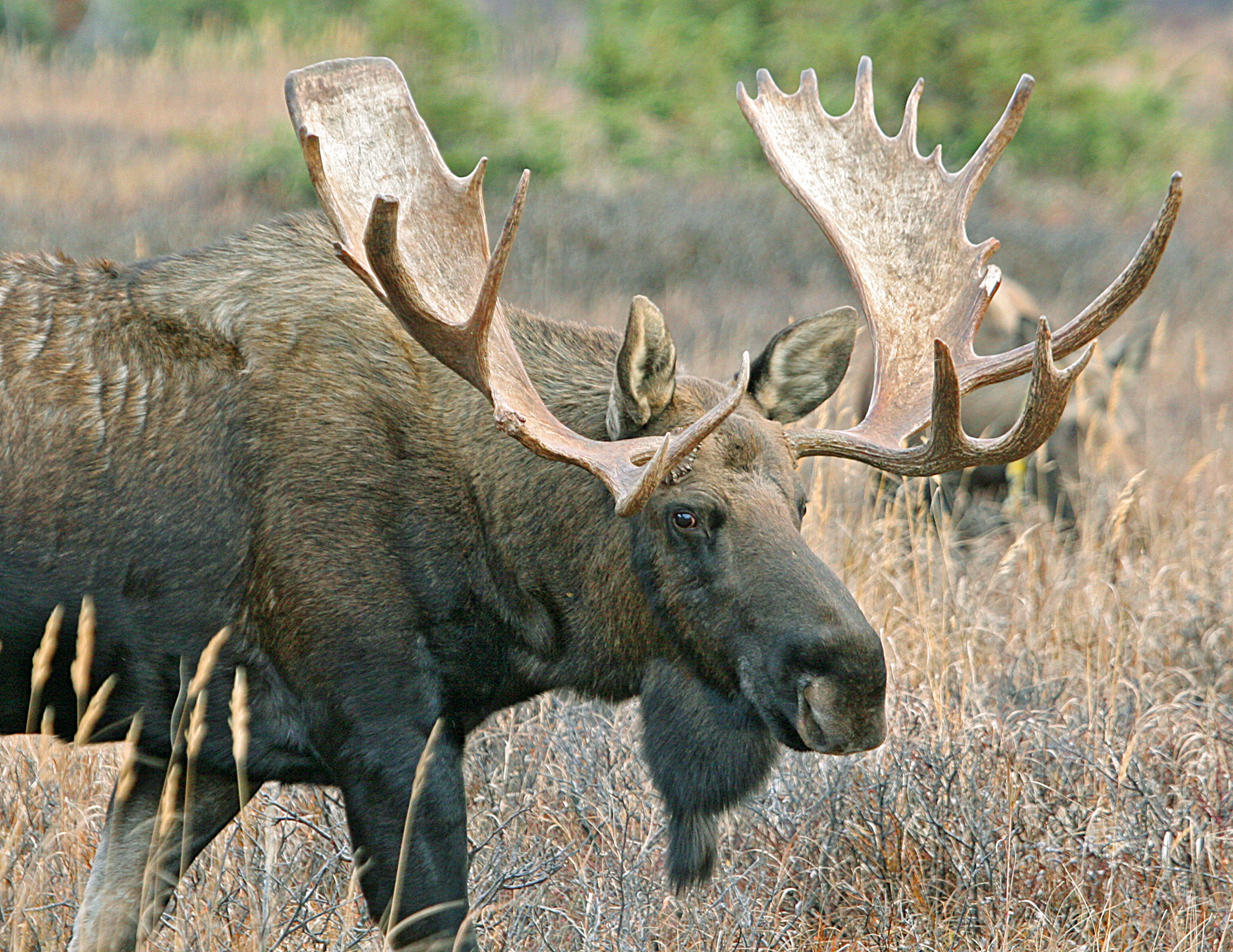
Moose

The even-toed ungulates are ungulates whose weight is borne about equally by the third and fourth toes, rather than mostly or entirely by the third as in perissodactyls. There are about 220 artiodactyl species, including many that are of great economic importance to humans.

- Family: Cervidae
  - Subfamily: Capreolinae
    - Genus: Alces
      - Moose, A. alces LC
    - Genus: Capreolus
      - Roe deer, C. capreolus LC
  - Subfamily: Cervinae
    - Genus: Cervus
      - Red deer, C. elaphus LC
    - Genus: Dama
      - European fallow deer, D. dama LC introduced
- Family: Bovidae
  - Genus: Bison
    - European bison, B. bonasus NT reintroduced
  - Genus: Bos
    - Aurochs, B. primigenius EX
- Family: Suidae
  - Genus: Sus
    - Wild boar, S. scrofa LC

== See also ==
- List of chordate orders
- List of prehistoric mammals
- Lists of mammals by region
- Mammal classification
- Mammals described in the 2000s
