= Apodemus uralensis cimrmani =

Cimrman Ural field mouse

Scientific classification
- Kingdom: Animalia
- Phylum: Chordata
- Class: Mammalia
- Order: Rodentia
- Family: Muridae
- Genus: Apodemus
- Species: A. uralensis
- Subspecies: A. u. cimrmani

Trinomial name
- Apodemus uralensis cimrmani Vohralík, 2002
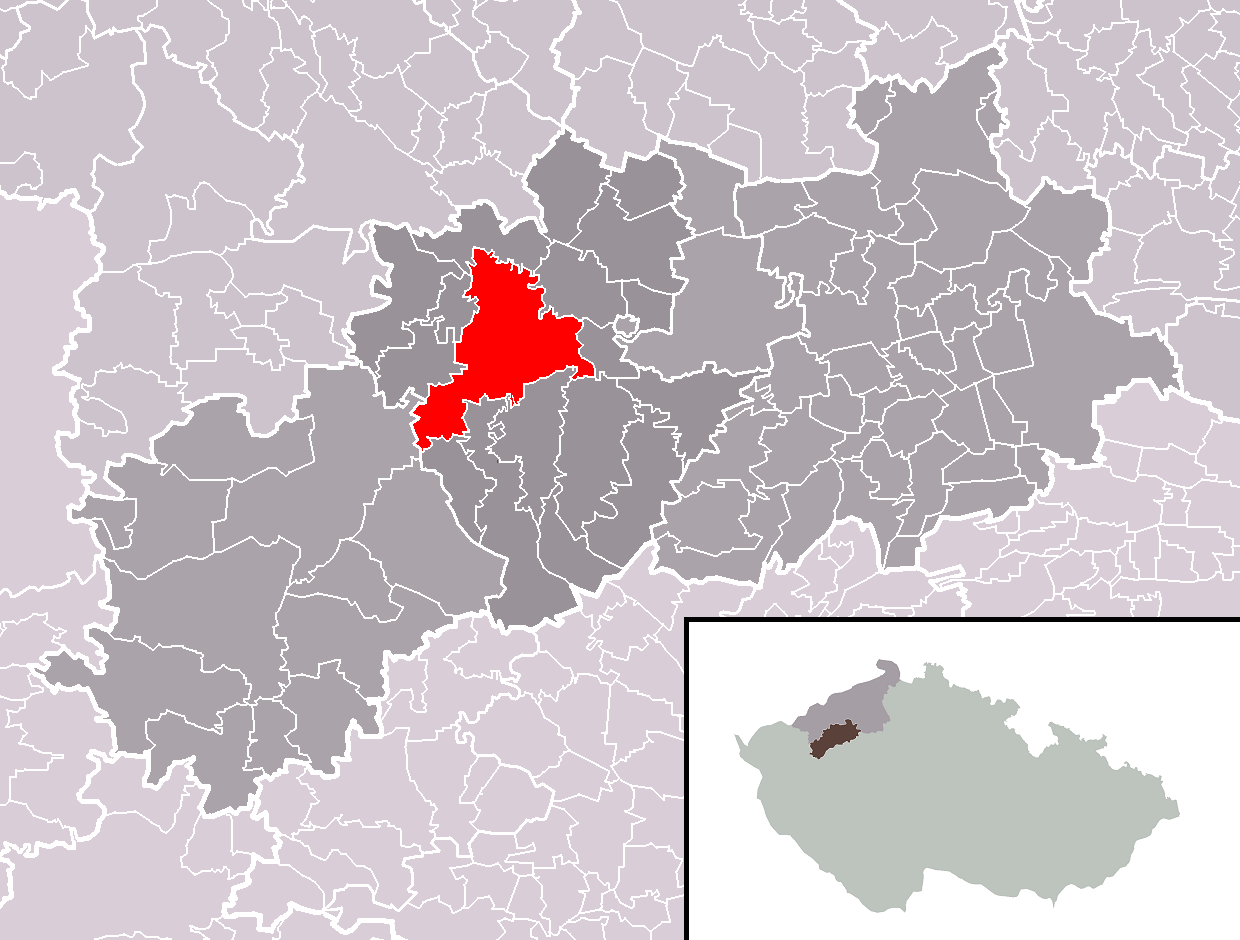
- Location of Žatec municipal territory within Louny District

Rare subspecies of Ural field mouse

Apodemus uralensis cimrmani, also known as Cimrman Ural field mouse, is a rare subspecies of Ural field mouse found only in the town of Žatec situated in the Ústí nad Labem Region, Czech Republic. It is the only endemic vertebrate species of the Czech Republic.

== Taxonomy ==
The pygmy field mouse Apodemus microps cimrmani represents a distinct subspecies first formally described by Vladimír Vohralík in 2002. This subspecies designation came after extensive analysis of owl pellet samples collected between 1974–1981 in northwestern Bohemia, Czech Republic, followed by additional trapping of live specimens to confirm the initial findings.

The taxonomic history of pygmy field mice has been complex, with various Latin names proposed over the decades. Before this subspecies was described, scientists had used several different scientific names for pygmy field mice across Central Europe, including Apodemus uralensis (Pallas, 1811), A. mosquensis (Ognev, 1913), A. ciscaucasicus (Ognev, 1924), and A. volhynensis (Migulin, 1938). The name A. microps, first established by Kratochvíl and Rosický in 1952, has been traditionally used for Central European populations.

What makes A. m. cimrmani taxonomically significant is the considerable morphological difference between this isolated northwestern Bohemian population and other A. microps populations. Statistical analysis showed these differences to be highly significant. Discriminant function analysis successfully separated the populations with a classification accuracy of 99.1% for A. m. cimrmani specimens and 94.4% for specimens from other regions.

The subspecies name cimrmani honours Jára Cimrman, a famous fictional Czech character portrayed as a versatile genius inventor, traveler, and theatrical figure from the early 20th century who has become a beloved cultural icon in the Czech Republic.

== Description ==
Apodemus microps cimrmani is a small rodent in the wood mouse family, distinguished by specific physical features that set it apart from related populations. This subspecies is remarkably tiny, even among pygmy field mice. The mouse has a brownish upper body with a darker shading on the middle part of its head. Its sides are also brownish, while the belly is a light gray colour. A fairly distinct line can be observed where the darker sides meet the lighter belly. Some individuals may display a small yellowish spot on their chest, though this feature varies considerably between specimens—being clearly visible in some mice, barely noticeable in others, and completely absent in many.

One of its most distinctive features is its dental characteristics. Its grinding teeth (molars) are notably smaller than those found in related populations, with the first upper row of molars measuring between 2.90–3.50 mm. Meanwhile, it has longer palatal openings (called foramina incisiva) measuring 4.3–5.4 mm. These openings are small holes in the roof of the mouth that connect the oral and nasal cavities in many mammals.

The mouse has very small ears and tiny hind feet, with the latter measuring just 17.3–18.6 mm in length. A typical adult weighs about 12–15.5 grams, with body lengths ranging from 70–87 mm (not including the tail), and tail lengths of approximately 66–77 mm. The genetic makeup of this mouse includes 48 chromosomes (2n=48). When comparing this subspecies to other pygmy field mice, researchers found that these physical differences were consistent across age groups and not merely the result of examining different aged specimens.

== Habitat and distribution ==
Apodemus microps cimrmani inhabits a small and isolated geographic area in northwestern Bohemia, Czech Republic, centerd around the town of Žatec. This population occupies a territory of about 25 km by 20 km, bounded by natural geographic features: the Doupovské hory Mountains to the west, the wooded landscapes of the Rakovnická pahorkatina Highland to the south and southeast, and likely the Ohře River to the north. The subspecies occupies a specific ecological niche characterized by low-lying, agricultural landscapes with minimal forest cover. Its habitat primarily consists of field edges and banks covered with grasses and various herbaceous vegetation. These areas are predominantly agricultural, intensively cultivated with cereals and sugar beet being the main crops.

The elevation range for this mouse is relatively narrow, typically between 220–300 metres above sea level, with only one documented location (Mašťov) reaching up to 375 metres. This region experiences a distinctly dry climate with annual precipitation below 450 mm in core areas and between 450–500 mm in marginal localities. The climate features mild winters and moderately warm summers, with average monthly temperatures in Podbořany (a core habitat area) of −2.5 °C in January, 17.8°C in July, and 7.7°C in October, yielding an annual average of 7.8°C. The soil composition throughout the habitat is predominantly black or brown, deep and fertile, supporting the intensive agricultural production that characterizes the region. Most of the area consists of large, open fields with minimal forest cover.

This isolated population is distant from other known pygmy field mouse populations, separated by approximately 190 km from the nearest populations in southwestern Poland and 230 km from southern Moravian populations. The origin of this isolated population remains unclear, with possible explanations including long-distance migration, relictual occurrence (surviving in this specific area while disappearing from surrounding regions), or isolation since the Boreal period (roughly 9,000 to 7,500 years ago).
