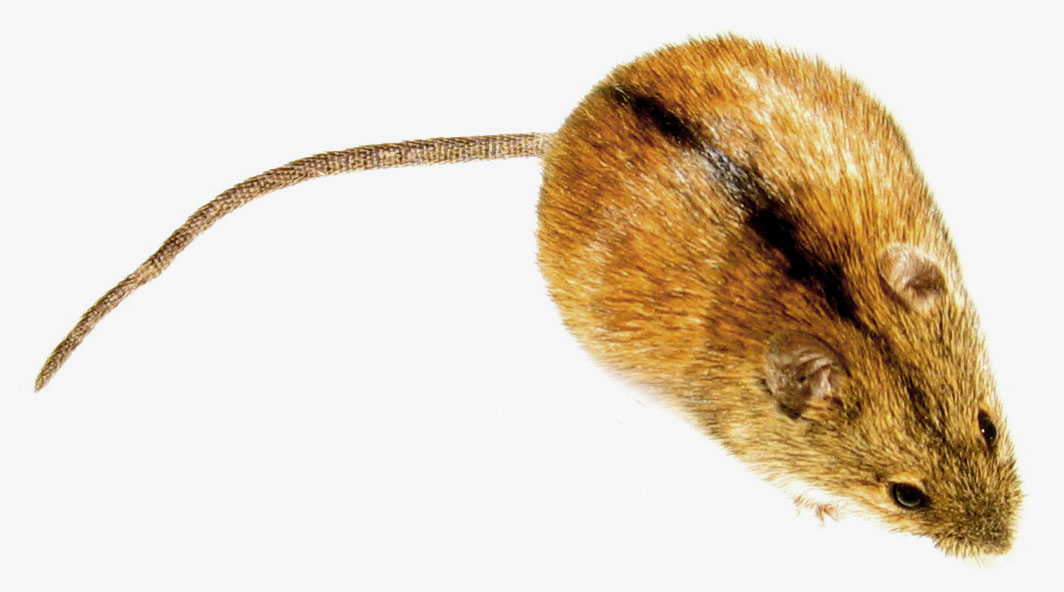

Conservation status
- Least Concern (IUCN 3.1)

Scientific classification
- Kingdom: Animalia
- Phylum: Chordata
- Class: Mammalia
- Order: Rodentia
- Family: Muridae
- Genus: Apodemus
- Species: A. agrarius

Binomial name
- Apodemus agrarius (Pallas, 1771)
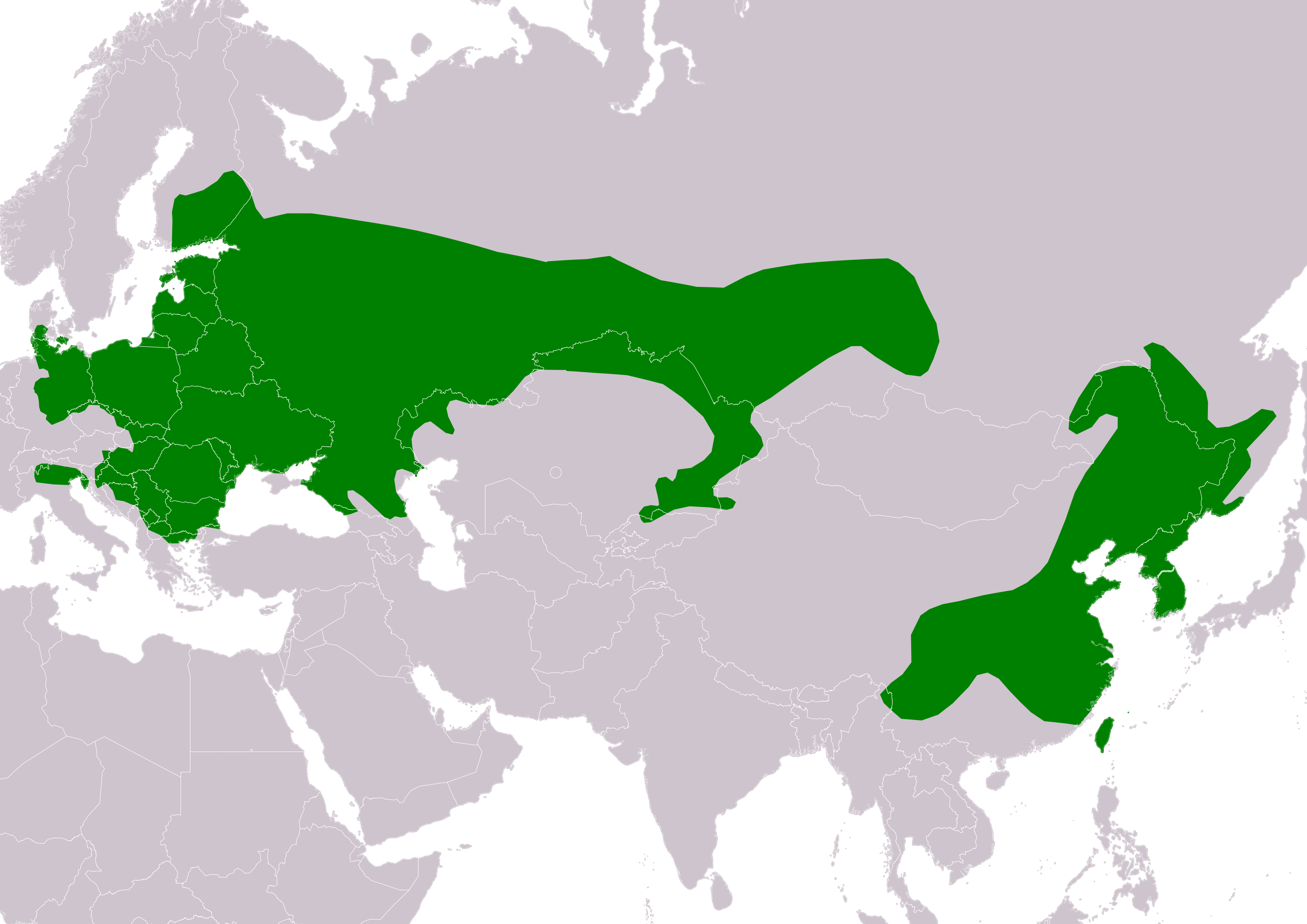
- Range of A. agrarius Resident

Synonyms
- (see text)

= Striped field mouse =

Species of rodent

The striped field mouse (Apodemus agrarius) is a rodent in the family Muridae. The range of this species stretches from Eastern Europe to Eastern Asia.

== Synonyms ==
Accepted synonyms include Apodemus albostriatus (Bechstein, 1801), Apodemus caucasicus (Kuznetzov, 1944), Apodemus chejuensis (Johnson and Jones, 1955), Apodemus coreae (Thomas, 1908), Apodemus gloveri (Kuroda, 1939), Apodemus harti (Thomas, 1898), Apodemus henrici (Lehmann, 1970), Apodemus insulaemus (Tokuda, 1939 and 1941), Apodemus istrianus (Kryštufek, 1985), Apodemus kahmanni (Malec and Storch, 1963), Apodemus karelicus (Ehrström, 1914), Apodemus maculatus (Bechstein, 1801), Apodemus mantchuricus (Thomas, 1898), Apodemus nicolskii (Charlemagne, 1933), Apodemus nikolskii (Migouline, 1927), Apodemus ningpoensis (Swinhoe, 1870), Apodemus ognevi (Johansen, 1923), Apodemus pallescens (Johnson and Jones, 1955), Apodemus pallidior (Thomas, 1908), Apodemus pratensis (Ockskay, 1831), Apodemus rubens (Oken, 1816), Apodemus septentrionalis (Ognev, 1924), Apodemus tianschanicus (Ognev, 1940) and Apodemus volgensis (Kuznetzov, 1944).

== Description ==
The upper parts of the striped field mouse are grayish brown with a rusty tint with a prominent mid-dorsal black stripe. The under parts are paler and grayish. The ears and eyes are relatively small. The body length reaches 126 mm, with a tail of up to 90 mm, and it weighs up to 50 g.

== Distribution and habitat ==
The striped field mouse has an extensive but disjunct distribution, split into two ranges. The first reaches from central and eastern Europe to Lake Baikal (Russia) in the north, and China in the south. The second includes parts of the Russian Far East and from there reaches from Mongolia to Japan. Its expansion across Eastern Europe appears to be relatively recent; the species is thought to have reached Austria in the 1990s.

The striped field mouse inhabits a wide range of habitats including the edges of woodlands, grasslands and marshes, pastures and gardens, and urban areas. In the winter, it may be found in haystacks, storehouses, and dwellings.

== Ecology ==
The striped field mouse excavates a short burrow with a nesting chamber at a shallow depth. It is nocturnal during the summer, but mainly diurnal in the winter. Its diet varies and includes green parts of plants, roots, seeds, berries, nuts, and insects. Three to five broods are born in a year with an average of six young per litter and the population can build up rapidly in a good season. Limiting factors include frequent torrential rains during a warm season, early soil freezing, and predation.

== Interaction with humans ==
The striped field mouse is a common agricultural pest within its range, particularly in years of population outbreaks, and a natural vector of diseases commonly associated with murine rodents.

== See also ==
- List of mammals of Korea
- List of mammals of Russia
- List of mammals of China
- List of mammals of Ukraine
- List of mammals of Belarus
- List of mammals of Lithuania
- List of mammals of Latvia
- List of mammals of Estonia
- List of mammals of Finland
- List of mammals of Poland
- List of mammals of Germany
- List of mammals of Hungary
- List of mammals of Romania
