= Caspian gray vole =

Conservation status
- Least Concern (IUCN 3.1)

Scientific classification
- Kingdom: Animalia
- Phylum: Chordata
- Class: Mammalia
- Order: Rodentia
- Family: Cricetidae
- Subfamily: Arvicolinae
- Genus: Microtus
- Species: M. mystacinus

Binomial name
- Microtus mystacinus (de Filippi, 1865)

Synonyms
- Microtus hyrcania G. G. Goodwin, 1940; Microtus arvalis khorkoutensis G. G. Goodwin, 1940

Species of rodent

The Caspian gray vole (Microtus mystacinus) is a species of vole (rodent) in the family Cricetidae.

== Distribution and habitat ==
It is found in Iran, in forests, shrublands, and grasslands.
