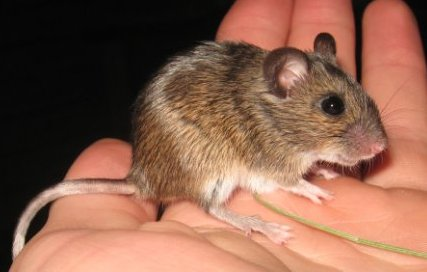

Conservation status
- Least Concern (IUCN 3.1)

Scientific classification
- Kingdom: Animalia
- Phylum: Chordata
- Class: Mammalia
- Infraclass: Placentalia
- Order: Rodentia
- Family: Muridae
- Genus: Apodemus
- Species: A. uralensis

Binomial name
- Apodemus uralensis (Pallas, 1811)
- Range of A. uralensis Resident

Synonyms
- Apodemus microps Pallas, 1811; Sylvaemus microps Kratochvil & Rosicky 1952

= Ural field mouse =

Species of rodent

The Ural field mouse (Apodemus uralensis) is a species of rodent in the family Muridae. It is also known as the pygmy field mouse. It is found in Armenia, Austria, Azerbaijan, Belarus, Bulgaria, China, Croatia, Czech Republic, Estonia, Georgia, Hungary, Kazakhstan, Latvia, Liechtenstein, Lithuania, Mongolia, Montenegro, Poland, Romania, Russian Federation, Serbia, Slovakia, Turkey and Ukraine.

== See also ==
- Apodemus uralensis cimrmani
