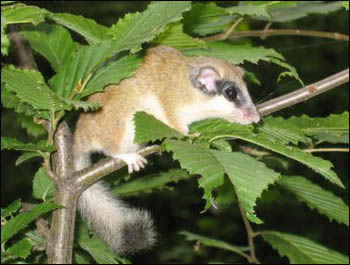

Conservation status
- Least Concern (IUCN 3.1)

Scientific classification
- Kingdom: Animalia
- Phylum: Chordata
- Class: Mammalia
- Order: Rodentia
- Family: Gliridae
- Genus: Dryomys
- Species: D. nitedula

Binomial name
- Dryomys nitedula (Pallas, 1778)
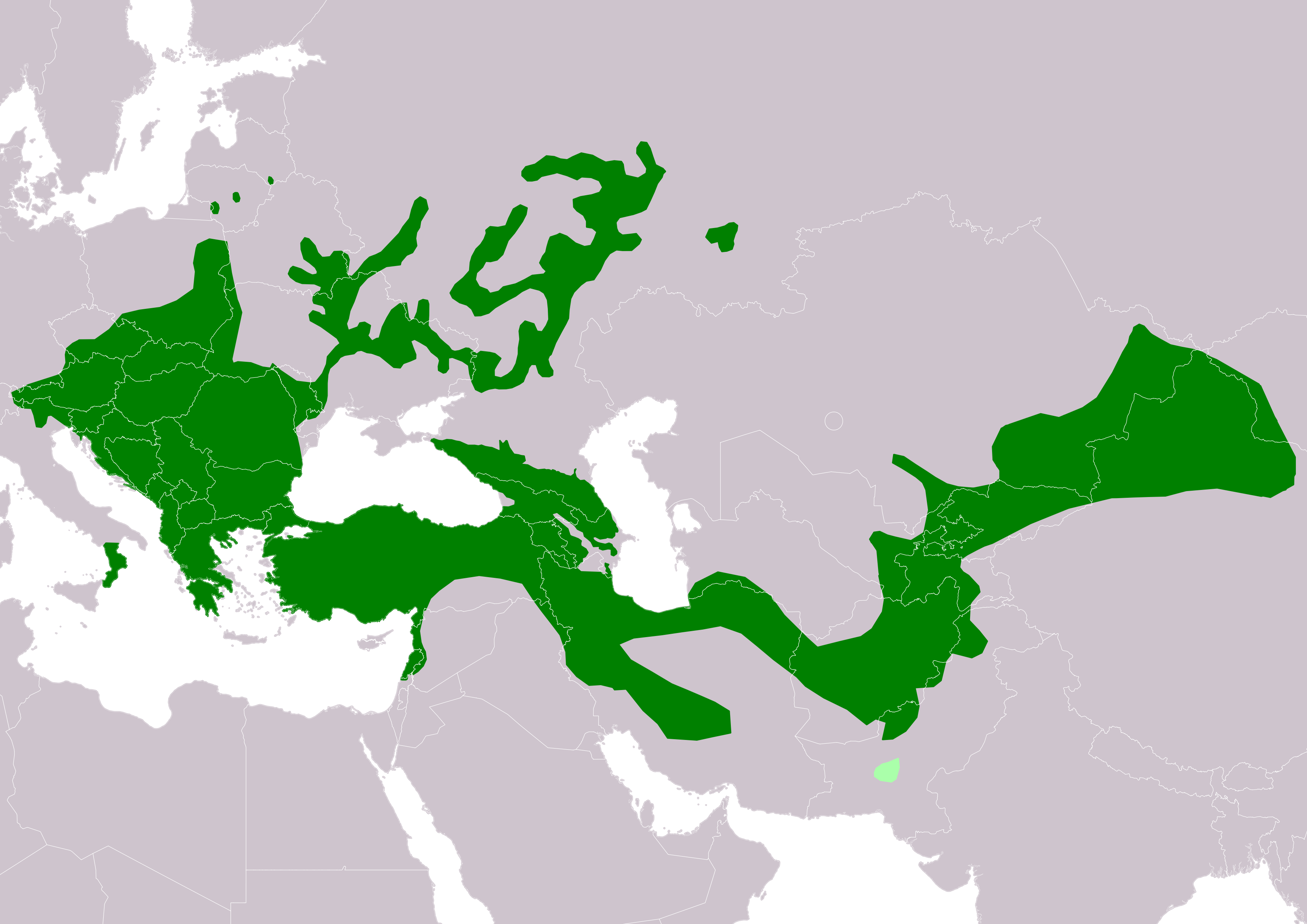
- Range of D. nitedula Resident Probably Extant, resident

= Forest dormouse =

Species of rodent

The forest dormouse (Dryomys nitedula) is a species of rodent in the family Gliridae found in eastern Europe, the Balkans and parts of western Central Asia. It is categorized as being of least concern in the IUCN List of Threatened Species due to its wide range and stable population trend. Forest dormice have a diploid count (2n) of 48 chromosomes. Even though this species lives in a variety of geographic locations, its greatest population density is in the forests of central Moldova, in Transcaucasia, and in the mountains of Central Asia. In most other locations, population density of this species is rather low. Population density is dependent on many factors. But the main features that this species depends on for choosing a location are the presence of the appropriate food sources as well as good foliage that can be used for a habitat. The reason why the forests in central Moldova have the highest population density is they provide the largest diversity of food sources which are available throughout the year. This location also provides the best type of foliage for the forest dormice to build their nests as well as swing from branches. The combination of both of these aspects allows for this species to have its highest needs met. Therefore, during mating season they produce offspring who also stay in the same general area when they mature. It makes sense not to move from an area if it is providing for your most basic needs.

The common name for Eliomys is the garden dormouse. Dryomys are often compared to Eliomys as they have many similarities. However, Dryomys is smaller. Two more differences between the two are the braincase for Dryomys is more rounded and the auditory bullae is smaller than that of Eliomys. In addition, their tails are slightly different. The Dryomys's tail is more uniform in color than that of Eliomys. The forest dormouse competes in artificial and natural nests with hazel dormice, fat dormice, and birds. Its biggest competitors are those species which eat similar types of food and who live in the same kind of habitat.

== Morphology ==
Its appearance is squirrel-like. On average, the forest dormouse is 110 mm long with a fluffy grey tail nearly as long as its body. The head and body length can range from 80 mm to 130 mm, while the length of the tail can range from 60 mm to 113 mm. The range of its body mass is between 18 grams and 34 grams. The fur on the upper parts of the body is grayish-brown while the underparts are yellowish-white. A black stripe surrounds the eye and extends to the small ear. The whiskers form a bushy tuft about 10mm long. There are six pads on each paw. It has bilateral symmetry and is endothermic.

== Distribution and habitat ==
The range of the forest dormouse is from Switzerland in the west, through central, eastern and southern Europe, the Balkan Peninsula, northward to the Baltic Sea and eastward to the Volga River and the Ural Mountains in Russia. Isolated populations occur outside this range, including in Israel, central Iran, Afghanistan, the Tien Shan mountains and Sinkiang in China. The forest dormouse lives in a wide range of habitats, including broad-leaved, mixed and coniferous woodlands. It is also found in rocky areas, dwarf montane woodland, evergreen shrubland and wood-steppe. It is reported to be found at altitudes up to 3,500 m.

This species is most likely to be found in dense forests. Forest dormice tend to create their natal nests on top of lower tree branches or in the midst of thick shrubbery. These nests are usually one to seven meters above ground level. They are spherically shaped with a diameter between 150mm to 250mm. Typically these nests only have one entrance and it faces the tree trunk. The outside of the nest is made from leaves and twigs. The inside of the nest has a lining that is created from bark and moss pieces. Forest dormice tend to pay great attention to detail when they create these natal nests. They want to make sure their young are protected.

== Biology ==
Depending on where this species is geographically located determines whether or not it hibernates and for how long. In Israel, forest dormice stay active throughout the year. However, during the winter they do go through a period of torpor for a certain amount of time each day. Forest dormice located in the north tend to hibernate from October until April. During this period of hibernation, northern dormice will sit on their back legs and curl up into a ball. Its tail will wrap around its body and its hands may touch its cheeks. In all hibernating species, body temperature decreases from the range of 35-37 °C to about 5 °C.

Not much is known about the mating rituals of this species. It is known that this species is dependent on maternal care for the first couple of weeks after birth. Female forest dormice have eight mammary glands. Forest dormice breed during various times of the year depending on their geographical location. For example, forest dormice who live in Israel have a breeding season that starts in March and lasts until December. However, in Europe breeding season is much shorter as it starts in March and only lasts until the end of August. There is a correlation between length of the breeding season and number of litters produced per year. For this reason, forest dormice who live in the south who have a longer breeding season usually produce two litters while the dormice who live in the north and have a very short breeding season usually only have time to produce one litter. The gestation period lasts about four weeks, and usually four or five young are born per litter. From time to time, it is possible for the female to give birth to up to seven young at one time. When the young are born, they weigh about 2 grams. The young dormice open their eyes at two weeks, and start eating solid food a week later. During the dependency period, the mother provides food, milk, grooming, and protection to the young. They leave the nest after about another three weeks and become sexually mature in the following year. There has not been much evidence for paternal care. However, it should not be ruled out. The average lifespan of forest dormice in the wild is five and a half years. The gender ratio is about 1:1, with insignificant predominance of females.

== Ecology ==
When it comes out of hibernation in the spring, the forest dormouse eats small invertebrates, baby birds, buds, shoots and the green parts of plants. Later in the year, the dormouse predominately eats fruits, nuts and seeds. In fact, this species eats fruits from about twenty different tree and bush species including: apricots, apples, cherries, plums, cherry plums, pears, peaches, blackberries. The population does not fluctuate much because the young reared each year only just makes up for those that die during hibernation. Sixty percent of young individuals and the majority of elderly adults (over the age of four) do not survive the winter. Another cause of mortality is storms which may cause the death of juveniles in unprotected nests. Dormice are also preyed upon by pine marten, stone martens, wildcats, owls and crows. Two of its main predators are tawny owls (Strix aluco) and Eurasian eagle-owls (Bubo bubo). However, due to individuals being extremely careful not to travel away from brushy cover forest dormice are difficult prey to find.

Forest dormice are very defensive. Not even in captivity are they tame. It has been noted that they may allow humans to pet them. However, when efforts are made to hold them, they bite with their sharp teeth. If agitated while resting they may wake up suddenly, leap high, spit, and hiss. Forest dormice may have a negative impact for humans due to raiding fruit orchards and chewing on the bark of coniferous trees. They have also been known to be vectors for such diseases as tick-borne encephalitis, leptospirosis, and possibly the Black Death. They may have a positive impact by controlling arthropod populations and scattering seeds.

== Behavior ==
Forest dormice spend a great amount of time in trees. They are capable of climbing with excellent agility as well as leap to and from branches as great as 2 meters apart from one another. This species has a natural tendency to create temporary nests which are fragile. This species does not spend much time in these temporary nests because much more energy is placed in making the natal nests.

This species is nocturnal. It is also very territorial. Adults live in low densities, usually only two to three per acre. Their territory range is from 65 to 100 m (213 to 328 ft) in diameter.

Forest dormice produce a variety of noises for a variety of reasons. The most significant is the sound for an alarm call which is a melodious squeak. They also have the ability to produce ultrasounds which are used for communication. The different communication methods that forest dormice use are visual, tactile, acoustic, and chemical. It is not known exactly how these forms of communication are used specifically for this species. However, it is known that most mammals use tactile communication during mating, conflict, and raising young. Chemical communication can play a significant role in being able to identify a specific individual. Visual cues are given off by body posture as a way to designate whether it is a hostile or friendly environment. The different perception methods that forest dormice use are visual, tactile, ultrasound, and chemical.

== Status ==
This species is considered endangered in the Czech Republic and as rare in a majority of the other European countries. The population is mostly threatened by the destruction of forests which is their habitat. There are many programs in place to help maintain and increase the forest dormice population. There is an international law to protect this species and it is under the EU Habitats and Species Directive (Annex IV) and the Berne Convention (Appendix III). All countries must abide by this law. In addition, a country may choose to create a national law or program in order to further provide methods to make sure this species is protected. For example, the English government rewards farmers who replant hedges. Hopefully, this will increase available shrubbery for dormice to occupy. Another program is administered by English Nature. This is a reintroduction program whose purpose is to place captive-bred dormice in locations where the population has been dwindling. In addition to these programs, the UK has created a National Dormouse Monitoring Programme. Its main purpose is to observe hazel dormice. However, the program components are used to observe and track all species of dormice.

== Ancestry ==
Recently, a fossil of a dormouse-like mammal was discovered. This fossil is thought to be the earliest eutherian ancestor. The fossil was complete and well preserved in a lake bed located in China. It was given the name Eomaia, which means ancient mother. The fossil has skeletal features that are closer to modern placentals than to marsupials. This is significant as it indicates the split between these two groups that occurred more than 125 million years ago. Before this fossil was discovered, the oldest recorded fossil of a placental mammal was teeth aging 110 million years old. The oldest skull and skeleton fossil for a placental mammal is only 75 million years old.
