= Hazel dormouse =

Hazel dormouse Temporal range: Early Pleistocene–Recent
- Hazel dormouse climbing a stem, Ukraine

Conservation status
- Least Concern (IUCN 3.1)

- Vulnerable (IUCN 3.1) (Great Britain)

Scientific classification
- Kingdom: Animalia
- Phylum: Chordata
- Class: Mammalia
- Order: Rodentia
- Family: Gliridae
- Subfamily: Leithiinae
- Genus: Muscardinus; Kaup, 1829
- Species: M. avellanarius

Binomial name
- Muscardinus avellanarius (Linnaeus, 1758)
- Geographic range

Synonyms
- Mus avellanarius Linnaeus, 1758

Species of rodent

The hazel dormouse or common dormouse (Muscardinus avellanarius) is a small dormouse species native to Europe and the only living species in the genus Muscardinus. Its habitat include mainly the woodland as well as hedgerows and scrub. The hazel dormouse are small nocturnal mammals that hibernate and are omnivores.

== Distribution and habitat ==
The hazel dormouse is native to northern Europe and Asia Minor. It is the only dormouse native to the British Isles, and is therefore often referred to simply as the "dormouse" in British sources, although the edible dormouse, Glis glis, has been accidentally introduced and now has an established population in South East England. Though Ireland has no native dormouse, the hazel dormouse was discovered in County Kildare in 2010, and appears to be spreading rapidly, helped by the prevalence of hedgerows in the Irish countryside.

The United Kingdom distribution of the hazel dormouse can be found on the National Biodiversity Network's website. Woodland habitat loss and management, together with the effects of climate change, are seen as material threats to their future status. Its population is estimated to have declined by 72% from 1993 to 2014.

=== Habitat ===
According to English Nature's Dormouse Conservation Handbook, hazel dormice are "particularly associated with deciduous woodland" but also inhabit hedgerows and scrub. In relation to its habitat, the hazel dormouse abundance was greater on sites with more honeysuckle, yew, and birch. Dormice seldom travel more than 70 m (230 ft) from their nest.

== Description ==
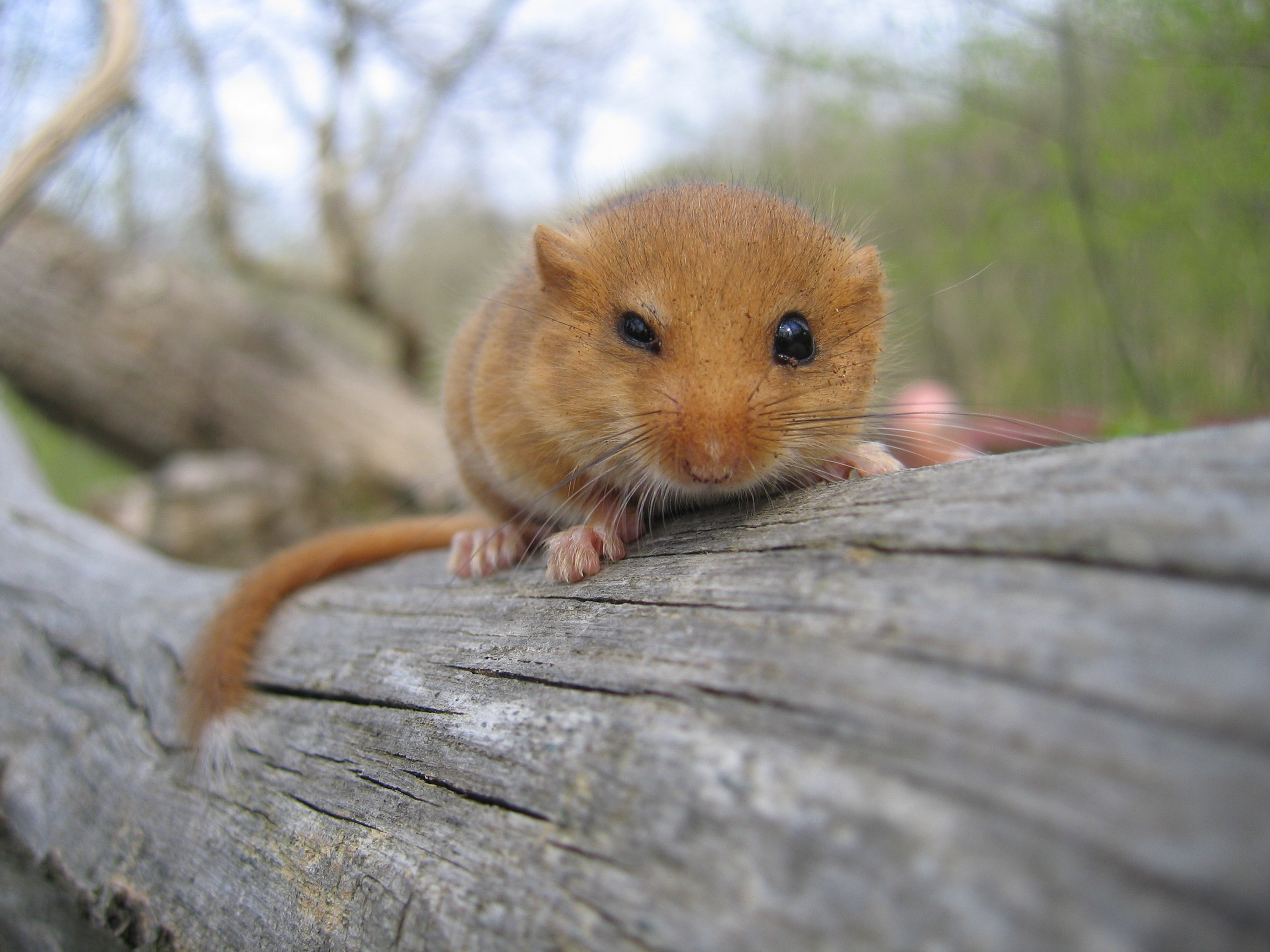
Hazel dormouse viewed from the front, Italy

The hazel dormouse can reach a body length of about 10 centimetres (3.9 in) and a length of about 16 centimetres (6.3 in) if you consider the tail as well. It is 6 to 9 cm (2.4 to 3.5 in) long with a tail of 5.7 to 7.5 cm (2.2 to 3.0 in). It weighs 17 to 20 g (0.60 to 0.71 oz), although this increases to 30 to 40 grams (1.1 to 1.4 oz) just before hibernation. This small mammal has reddish brown fur that can vary up to golden-brown or yellow-orange-brown becoming lighter in the lower part. Eyes are large and black. Ears are small and not very developed, while the tail is long and completely covered with hair.

It is a nocturnal creature and spends most of its waking hours among the branches of trees looking for food. It will make long detours rather than come down to the ground and expose itself to danger. The hazel dormouse hibernates from October to April–May.

== Behaviour ==
Starting from the onset of colder weather (October or November), the hazel dormouse hibernates in nests on the ground, at the base of old coppiced trees or hazel stools, under piles of leaves, or under log piles, as these areas are not subject to extreme variations in either temperature or humidity. Dormice are almost completely arboreal in habit and are less reluctant to cross open ground. When it wakes up in spring (late April or early May), it builds woven nests of shredded honeysuckle bark, fresh leaves, and grasses in the undergrowth. If the weather is cold and wet and food is scarce, it saves energy by going into torpor; it curls up into a ball and goes to sleep. The hazel dormouse, therefore, spends a large proportion of its life sleeping, either hibernating in winter or in torpor in summer.

An examination of hazelnuts may show a neat, round hole in the shell. This indicates it has been opened by a small rodent, e.g. the dormouse, wood mouse, or bank vole. Other animals, such as squirrels or jays, will either split the shell completely in half or make a jagged hole in it. Further examination reveals the cut surface of the hole has toothmarks which follow the direction of the shell. In addition, there will be toothmarks on the outer surface of the nut, at an angle of about 45 degrees to the cut surface. Woodmice and voles bite across the nutshell leaving clear parallel toothmarks from inside to outside. Woodmice also leave toothmarks on the outer surface of the nut but voles do not.

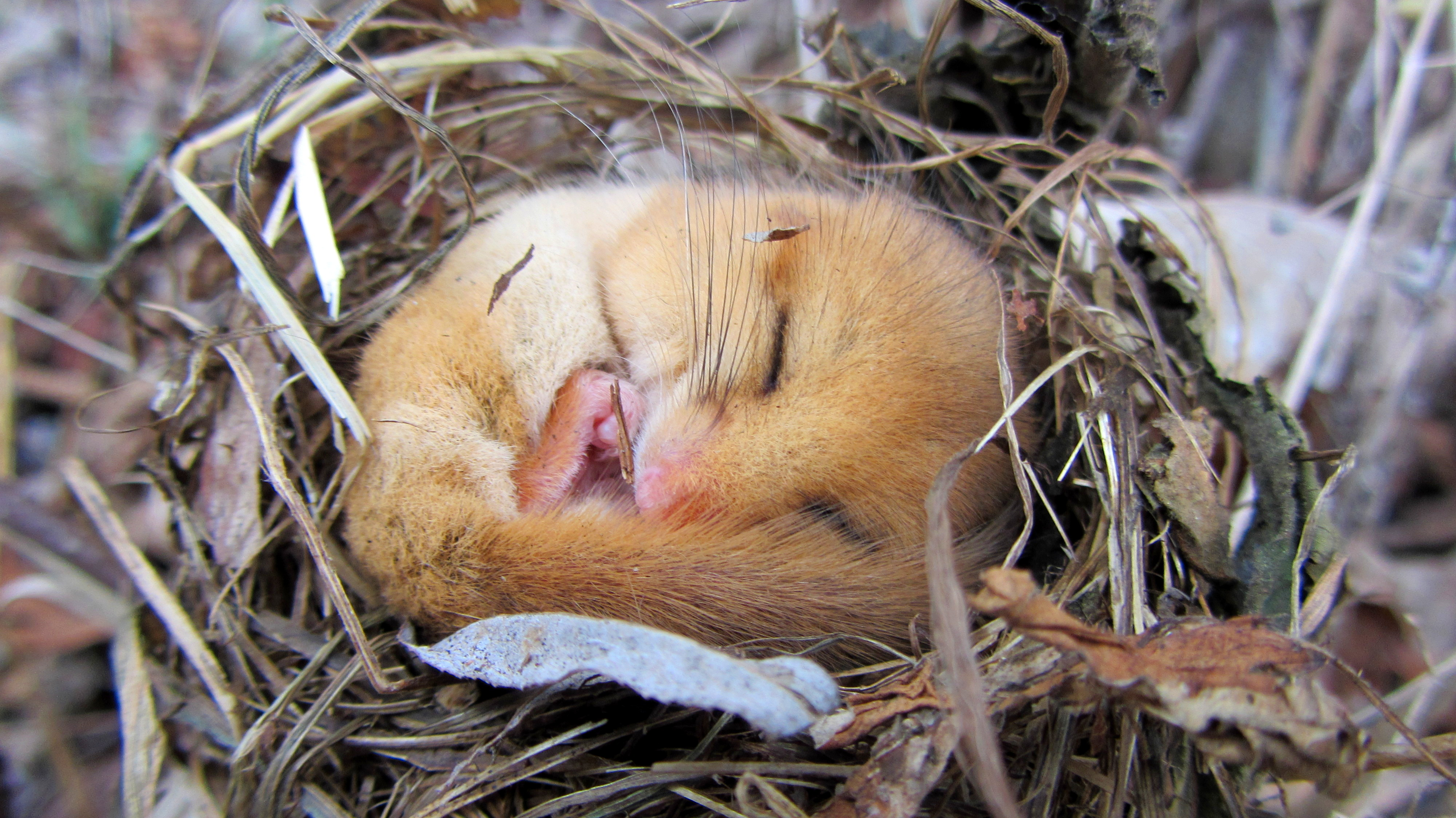
Hibernating hazel dormouse at the end of March, Germany

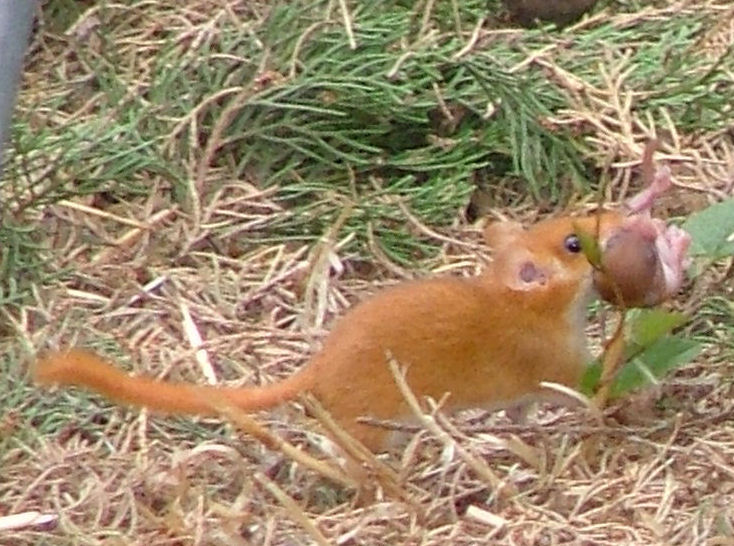
Hazel dormouse carrying its newborn baby, Italy

Video of a hazel dormouse beside its nest, the Netherlands

== Diet ==
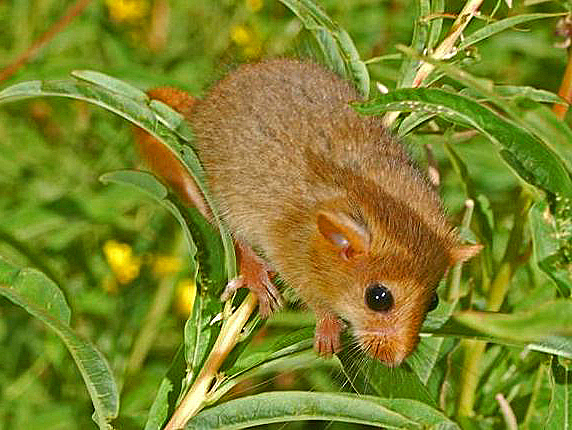
Hazel dormouse climbing an Epilobium, Italy

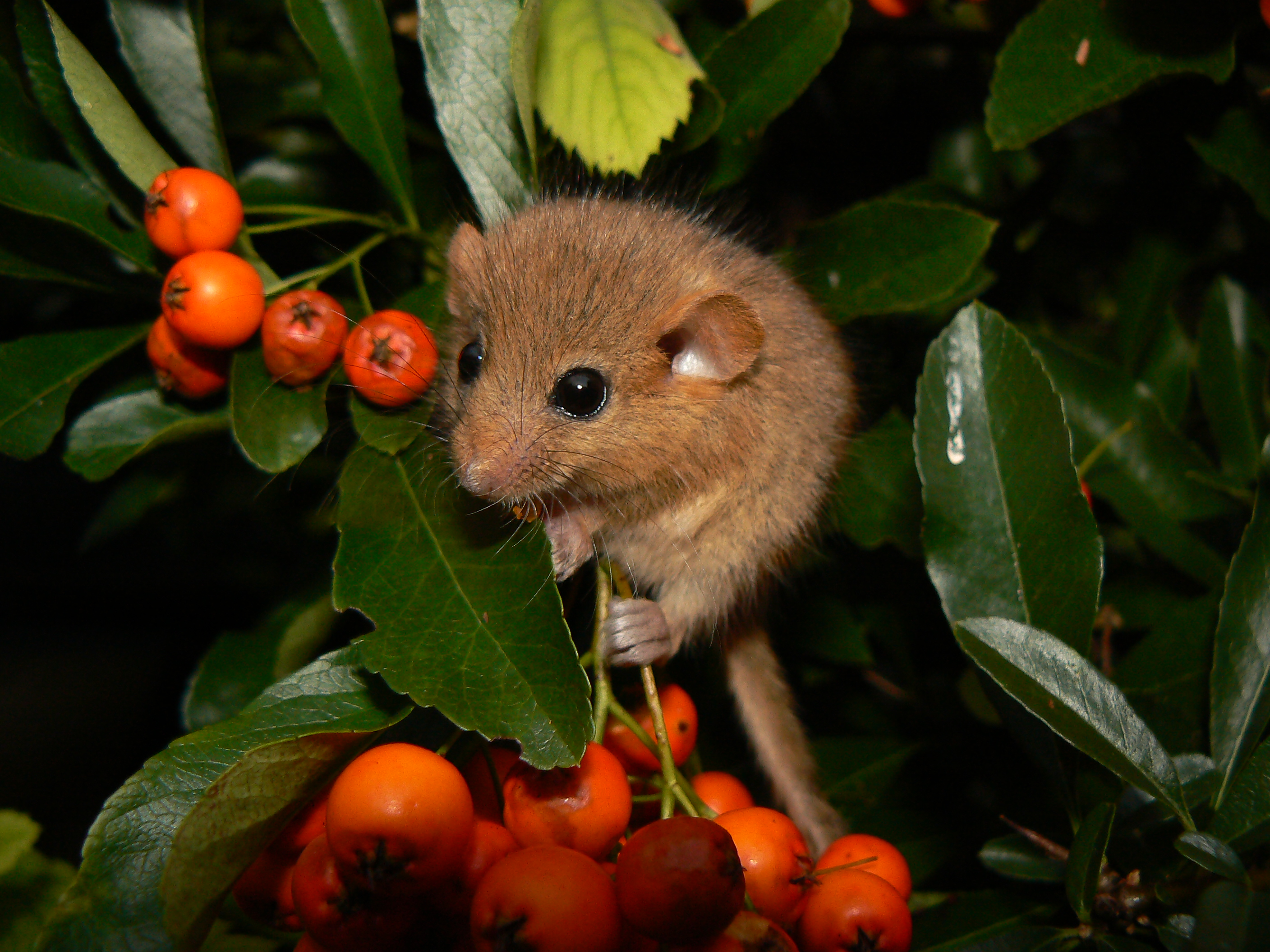
Hazel dormouse climbing a firethorn

The hazel dormouse requires a variety of arboreal foods to survive. It eats berries, nuts, and other fruit, with hazelnuts being the main food for gaining weight before hibernation. The dormouse also eats hornbeam and blackthorn fruit where hazel is scarce. Other food sources are the buds of young leaves, and flowers which provide nectar and pollen. The dormouse also eats insects found on food-source trees, particularly aphids and caterpillars.

=== Plants of value to dormice ===
- Hazel is the principal food source, supports insects, forms an understory of poles, especially when coppiced, which makes it useful for its arboreal activity. The hazel dormouse's Latin name avellanarius means "hazel".
- Oaks supply insect and flower food; the acorns are of little value.
- Honeysuckle bark is their primary nesting material, and flowers and fruit are used for food.
- Bramble flowers and fruits provide food over a long period. The thorns give protection for nests. Dormice thrive on blackberries.
- Alder buckthorn – in parts of the dormouse range where hazel is scarce or absent, berries of alder buckthorn are the principal food source and vital for the accumulation of fat reserves in autumn prior to hibernation.
- Willow – unripe seeds in early spring.
- Birch – seeds.
- Hawthorn flowers are an important food in the spring. The fruit is eaten occasionally.
- Blackthorn – fruits (blackthorn fruit is called "sloe").
- Ash – seed keys whilst they are still on the tree.
- Sycamore supplies insects and pollen, and a habitat. However, they cast a dense shade which decreases the understory.
- Hornbeam – seeds.
- Wayfaring tree (Viburnum lantana) – fruits and flowers.
- Broom – flowers (in early summer).
- Yew – fruits are a favoured food.
- Sweet chestnut provides an excellent food source, and the flowers are eaten, as well.

== Threats ==
This species has multiple threats to its continued survival. It faces predation from a wide range of animals, including foxes, wild boars, weasels, owls, and domestic cats. Badgers frequently dig up or disturb the hazel dormouse during hibernation. The depletion or eradication of the hazel dormouse's food sources are also cited as a threat, commonly caused by deforestation, hedge-trimming, or food competition from other species like squirrels, other dormouse species, and mice. A reduction in traditional forest management and a warming climate are also factors for the hazel dormouse's decline.

== Protection status ==
The hazel dormouse is protected by and in UK under the Wildlife and Countryside Act. At European level, the hazel dormouse is classed as In Need of Strict Protection under annex IV of the Habitats Directive 92/43/EEC "Gliridae - All species except Glis glis and Eliomys quercinus".

== Evolution ==
The oldest fossils of the genus Muscardinus date to the Serravallian stage of the Middle Miocene approximately 13.8 to 11.6 million years ago in what is now Spain. The oldest fossils of the modern species date to the Early Pleistocene.
