= List of arvicolines =

Species in mammal subfamily Arvicolinae

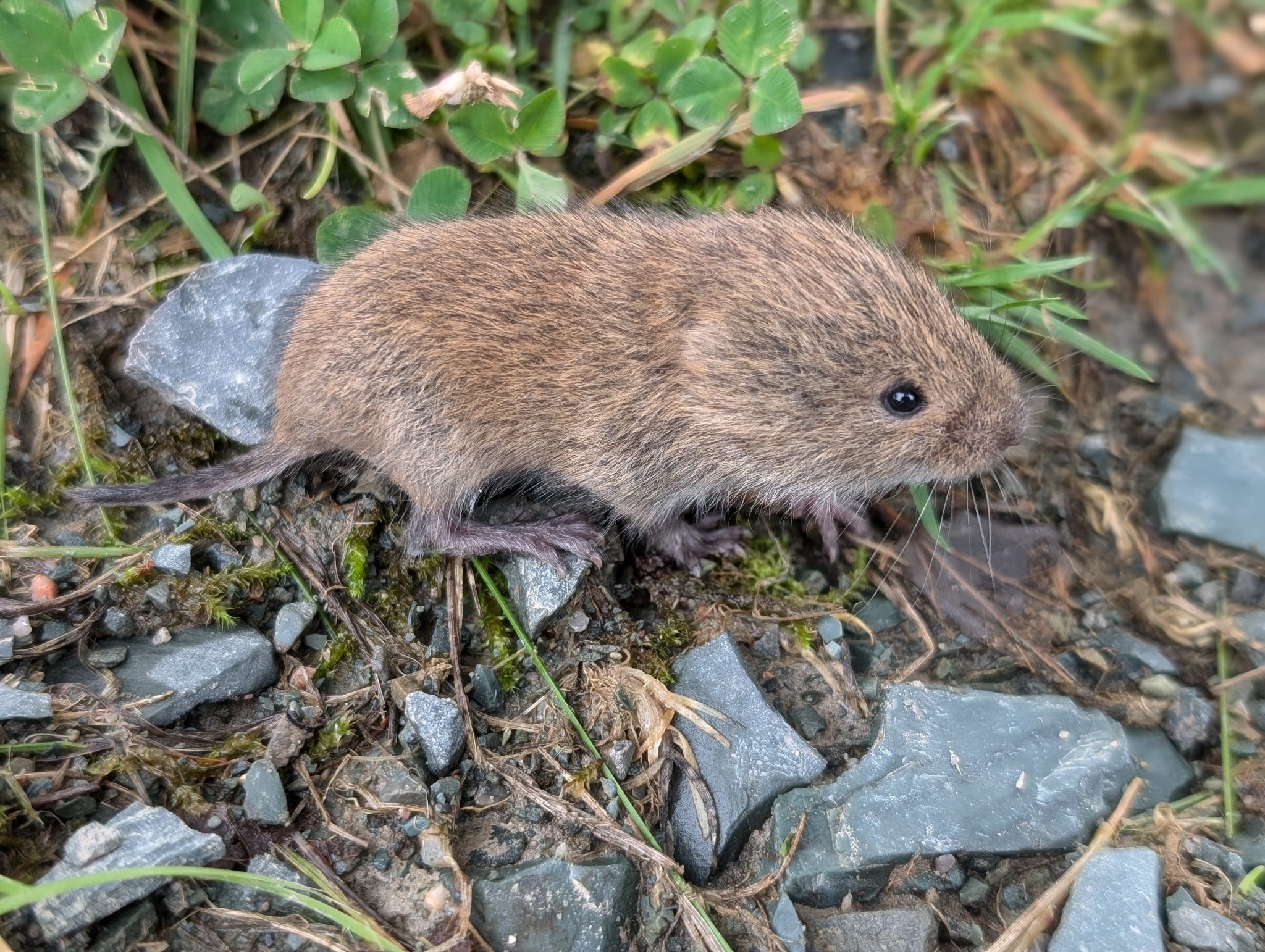
Eastern meadow vole (Microtus pennsylvanicus)

Arvicolinae is a subfamily of mammals in the rodent family Cricetidae, which in turn is part of the Myomorpha suborder in the order Rodentia. Members of this subfamily are called arvicolines and include voles, lemmings, and muskrats. They are found in North America, Europe, and Asia, primarily in forests, shrublands, grasslands, and wetlands, though some species can be found in deserts and rocky areas. They range in size from the woodland vole, at 6 cm (2 in) plus a 1 cm (0.4 in) tail, to the muskrat, at 30 cm (12 in) plus a 25 cm (10 in) tail. Arvicolines generally eat grass, leaves, twigs, bulbs, tubers, seeds, nuts, and other vegetation, though some also eat fungi and invertebrates. Almost no arvicolines have population estimates, but three species—the Lake Baikal mountain vole, Tarabundí vole, and Zempoaltépec vole—are categorized as endangered.

The 158 extant species of Arvicolinae are divided into 30 genera, with over a third of species, 57, in the Microtus genus. Several extinct prehistoric arvicoline species have been discovered, though due to ongoing research and discoveries, the exact number and categorization are not fixed.

== Conventions ==
IUCN Red List categories
Conservation status
- EX: Extinct (0 species)
- EW: Extinct in the wild (0 species)
- CR: Critically endangered (0 species)
- EN: Endangered (3 species)
- VU: Vulnerable (5 species)
- NT: Near threatened (11 species)
- LC: Least concern (126 species)

Other categories
- DD: Data deficient (13 species)
- NE: Not evaluated (0 species)

The author citation for the species or genus is given after the scientific name; parentheses around the author citation indicate that this was not the original taxonomic placement. Conservation status codes listed follow the International Union for Conservation of Nature (IUCN) Red List of Threatened Species. Range maps are provided wherever possible; if a range map is not available, a description of the arvicoline's range is provided. Ranges are based on the IUCN Red List for that species unless otherwise noted.

== Classification ==
Arvicolinae is a subfamily of the rodent family Cricetidae consisting of 158 extant species in 30 genera. These genera range in size from 1 to 57 species. This does not include hybrid species or extinct prehistoric species.

Subfamily Arvicolinae

- Genus Alexandromys (grass voles): eleven species
- Genus Alticola (high mountain voles): twelve species
- Genus Arborimus (tree voles): three species
- Genus Arvicola (water voles): three species
- Genus Caryomys (brownish voles): two species
- Genus Chionomys (snow voles): eleven species
- Genus Clethrionomys (bank voles): five species
- Genus Craseomys (grey-sided voles): six species
- Genus Dicrostonyx (collared lemmings): eight species
- Genus Dinaromys (Balkan snow vole): one species
- Genus Ellobius (mole voles): five species
- Genus Eolagurus (steppe lemmings): two species
- Genus Eothenomys (Père David's voles): eight species
- Genus Hyperacrius (Kashmir voles): two species
- Genus Lagurus (steppe lemming): one species
- Genus Lasiopodomys (narrow-headed steppe voles): two species
- Genus Lemmiscus (sagebrush vole): one species
- Genus Lemmus (lemmings): five species
- Genus Microtus (meadow voles): 57 species
- Genus Myopus (wood lemming): one species
- Genus Neodon (mountain voles): six species
- Genus Neofiber (round-tailed muskrat): one species
- Genus Ondatra (muskrat): one species
- Genus Phaiomys (Blyth's vole): one species
- Genus Phenacomys (heather voles): two species
- Genus Proedromys (Duke of Bedford's voles): two species
- Genus Prometheomys (long-clawed mole vole): one species
- Genus Stenocranius (narrow-headed voles): two species
- Genus Synaptomys (bog lemmings): two species
- Genus Volemys (Szechuan voles): two species

- Arvicolinae
  - - - Lemmiscus
      - - - Clethrionomyini
            - - Caryomys
              - Eothenomys
            - - Craseomys
              - - Alticola
                - Clethrionomys
        - - - Ellobiusini
              Ellobius
            - Pliomyini
              - Dinaromys
              - Hyperacrius
          - - - Lagurini
                - Eolagurus
                - Lagurus
            - - Arvicolini
                Arvicola
              - Microtini
                - Chionomys
                - - - Proedromys
                    - Volemys
                  - - Mictomicrotus
                    - - Microtus
                      - - - Neodon
                          - Phaiomys
                        - - Alexandromys
                          - - Lasiopodomys
                            - Stenocranius
    - - - Ondatrini
          - Neofiber
          - Ondatra
      - - - Lemmini
            - Lemmus
            - Myopus
            - Synaptomys
        - - Dicrostonychini
            Dicrostonyx
          - Pliophenacomyini
            - Arborimus
            - Phenacomys
  - - Prometheomyini
      Prometheomys

== Arvicolines ==
The following classification is based on the taxonomy described by the reference work Mammal Species of the World (2005), with augmentation by generally accepted proposals made since using molecular phylogenetic analysis, as supported by both the IUCN and the American Society of Mammalogists.

Genus Alexandromys – Ognev, 1914 – eleven species
| Common name | Scientific name and subspecies | Range | Size and ecology | IUCN status and estimated population |
|---|---|---|---|---|
| Evorsk vole | A. evoronensis (Kovalskaya & Sokolov, 1980) | Southeastern Russia | Size: 12–16 cm (5–6 in) long, plus 4–7 cm (2–3 in) tail Habitat: Grassland Diet: Grass, leaves, twigs, bulbs, tubers, seeds, nuts, and other vegetation | DD Unknown |
| Japanese grass vole | A. montebelli (A. Milne-Edwards, 1872) | Japan | Size: 9–14 cm (4–6 in) long, plus 2–5 cm (1–2 in) tail Habitat: Forest and inland wetlands Diet: Grass, leaves, twigs, bulbs, tubers, seeds, nuts, and other vegetation | LC Unknown |
| Lacustrine vole | A. limnophilus (Büchner, 1889) | Mongolia and China | Size: 8–12 cm (3–5 in) long, plus 2–5 cm (1–2 in) tail Habitat: Shrubland, grassland, rocky areas, and desert Diet: Grass, leaves, twigs, bulbs, tubers, seeds, nuts, and other vegetation | LC Unknown |
| Maximowicz's vole | A. maximowiczii (Schrenck, 1859) | Eastern Asia | Size: 11–16 cm (4–6 in) long, plus 2–6 cm (1–2 in) tail Habitat: Forest Diet: Grass, leaves, twigs, bulbs, tubers, seeds, nuts, and other vegetation | LC Unknown |
| Middendorff's vole | A. middendorffii (Poliakov, 1881) | East-central Russia | Size: 9–15 cm (4–6 in) long, plus 2–5 cm (1–2 in) tail Habitat: Forest, grassland, and inland wetlands Diet: Grass, leaves, twigs, bulbs, tubers, seeds, nuts, and other vegetation | LC Unknown |
| Mongolian vole | A. mongolicus (Radde, 1861) | Eastern Asia | Size: 8–13 cm (3–5 in) long, plus 2–4 cm (1–2 in) tail Habitat: Forest and shrubland Diet: Grass, leaves, twigs, bulbs, tubers, seeds, nuts, and other vegetation | LC Unknown |
| Muya Valley vole | A. mujanensis (Orlov & Kovalskaya, 1978) | Southeastern Russia | Size: 11–16 cm (4–6 in) long, plus 3–6 cm (1–2 in) tail Habitat: Forest Diet: Grass, leaves, twigs, bulbs, tubers, seeds, nuts, and other vegetation | DD Unknown |
| Reed vole | A. fortis (Büchner, 1889) | Eastern Asia | Size: 11–18 cm (4–7 in) long, plus 3–8 cm (1–3 in) tail Habitat: Inland wetlands Diet: Grass, leaves, twigs, bulbs, tubers, seeds, nuts, and other vegetation | LC Unknown |
| Sakhalin vole | A. sachalinensis (Vassin, 1955) | Eastern Russia | Size: 10–18 cm (4–7 in) long, plus 3–8 cm (1–3 in) tail Habitat: Grassland and inland wetlands Diet: Grass, leaves, twigs, bulbs, tubers, seeds, nuts, and other vegetation | LC Unknown |
| Taiwan vole | A. kikuchii (Kuroda, 1920) | Taiwan | Size: 10–14 cm (4–6 in) long, plus 8–10 cm (3–4 in) tail Habitat: Forest and grassland Diet: Grass, leaves, twigs, bulbs, tubers, seeds, nuts, and other vegetation | LC Unknown |
| Tundra vole | A. oeconomus (Pallas, 1776) | Europe, northern Asia, and northwestern North America | Size: 7–15 cm (3–6 in) long, plus 2–6 cm (1–2 in) tail Habitat: Forest, shrubland, grassland, and inland wetlands Diet: Grass, leaves, twigs, bulbs, tubers, seeds, nuts, and other vegetation | LC Unknown |

Genus Alticola – Blanford, 1881 – twelve species
| Common name | Scientific name and subspecies | Range | Size and ecology | IUCN status and estimated population |
|---|---|---|---|---|
| Central Kashmir vole | A. montosa (F. W. True, 1894) | Northern Pakistan and northern India | Size: 10–13 cm (4–5 in) long, plus 4–7 cm (2–3 in) tail Habitat: Forest and rocky areas Diet: Stems and leaves | VU Unknown |
| Flat-headed vole | A. strelzowi (Kaschtschenko, 1899) | Central Asia | Size: 10–14 cm (4–6 in) long, plus 3–5 cm (1–2 in) tail Habitat: Grassland Diet: Stems and leaves | LC Unknown |
| Gobi Altai mountain vole | A. barakshin Bannikov, 1947 | Central Asia | Size: 9–13 cm (4–5 in) long, plus 1–3 cm (0.4–1.2 in) tail Habitat: Grassland Diet: Stems and leaves | LC Unknown |
| Lake Baikal mountain vole | A. olchonensis Litvinov, 1960 | Southern Russia | Size: 10–13 cm (4–5 in) long, plus 3–4 cm (1–2 in) tail Habitat: Rocky areas Diet: Stems and leaves | EN Unknown |
| Large-eared vole | A. macrotis (Radde, 1862) | Central Asia | Size: 9–12 cm (4–5 in) long, plus 3–5 cm (1–2 in) tail Habitat: Rocky areas Diet: Stems and leaves | LC Unknown |
| Lemming vole | A. lemminus (G. S. Miller, 1899) | Eastern Russia | Size: 8–12 cm (3–5 in) long, plus 1–3 cm (0.4–1.2 in) tail Habitat: Rocky areas Diet: Stems and leaves | LC Unknown |
| Mongolian silver vole | A. semicanus (Allen, 1928) | Central Asia | Size: 9–14 cm (4–6 in) long, plus 2–4 cm (1–2 in) tail Habitat: Grassland Diet: Stems and leaves | LC Unknown |
| Royle's mountain vole | A. roylei (J. E. Gray, 1842) | Northern India | Size: 9–12 cm (4–5 in) long, plus 2–5 cm (1–2 in) tail Habitat: Forest, shrubland, grassland, and rocky areas Diet: Stems and leaves | NT Unknown |
| Silver mountain vole | A. argentatus (Sévertsov, 1879) | Central Asia | Size: 8–12 cm (3–5 in) long, plus 3–7 cm (1–3 in) tail Habitat: Shrubland, grassland, and rocky areas Diet: Stems and leaves | LC Unknown |
| Stolička's mountain vole | A. stoliczkanus (Blanford, 1875) | China and Nepal | Size: 9–13 cm (4–5 in) long, plus 1–3 cm (0–1 in) tail Habitat: Forest, shrubland, grassland, and rocky areas Diet: Stems and leaves | LC Unknown |
| Tuva silver vole | A. tuvinicus Ognev, 1950 | Central Asia | Size: 9–13 cm (4–5 in) long, plus 3–5 cm (1–2 in) tail Habitat: Rocky areas Diet: Stems and leaves | LC Unknown |
| White-tailed mountain vole | A. albicaudus (True, 1894) | Northern India | Size: 10–11 cm (4 in) long, plus 2–4 cm (1–2 in) tail Habitat: Rocky areas and shrubland Diet: Stems and leaves | DD Unknown |

Genus Arborimus – Taylor, 1915 – three species
| Common name | Scientific name and subspecies | Range | Size and ecology | IUCN status and estimated population |
|---|---|---|---|---|
| Red tree vole | A. longicaudus (True, 1890) | Western United States | Size: 9–11 cm (4 in) long, plus 6–9 cm (2–4 in) tail Habitat: Forest Diet: Conifer needles | NT Unknown |
| Sonoma tree vole | A. pomo Johnson & George, 1991 | Western California | Size: 9–11 cm (4 in) long, plus 6–8 cm (2–3 in) tail Habitat: Forest Diet: Conifer needles | NT Unknown |
| White-footed vole | A. albipes (Merriam, 1901) | Western United States | Size: 10–11 cm (4 in) long, plus 6–8 cm (2–3 in) tail Habitat: Forest and inland wetlands Diet: Conifer needles | LC Unknown |

Genus Arvicola – Lacépède, 1799 – three species
| Common name | Scientific name and subspecies | Range | Size and ecology | IUCN status and estimated population |
|---|---|---|---|---|
| European water vole | A. amphibius (Linnaeus, 1758) | Europe and Asia | Size: 12–23 cm (5–9 in) long, plus 5–14 cm (2–6 in) tail Habitat: Forest, grassland, and inland wetlands Diet: Aquatic plants, herbs, grass, twigs, buds, roots, bulbs, and fruit | LC Unknown |
| Italian water vole | A. italicus Savi, 1838 | South-central Europe | Size: 16–20 cm (6–8 in) long, plus 8–11 cm (3–4 in) tail Habitat: Forest and inland wetlands Diet: Aquatic plants, herbs, grass, twigs, buds, roots, bulbs, and fruit | NT Unknown |
| Southwestern water vole | A. sapidus Miller, 1908 | Western Europe | Size: 16–22 cm (6–9 in) long, plus 10–14 cm (4–6 in) tail Habitat: Inland wetlands Diet: Aquatic plants, herbs, grass, twigs, buds, roots, bulbs, and fruit | NT Unknown |

Genus Caryomys – Thomas, 1911 – two species
| Common name | Scientific name and subspecies | Range | Size and ecology | IUCN status and estimated population |
|---|---|---|---|---|
| Ganzu vole | C. eva (Thomas, 1911) | Central China | Size: 8–11 cm (3–4 in) long, plus 4–6 cm (2 in) tail Habitat: Forest Diet: Grass, leaves, twigs, bulbs, tubers, seeds, nuts, and other vegetation | LC Unknown |
| Kolan vole | C. inez (Thomas, 1908) | Central China | Size: 8–11 cm (3–4 in) long, plus 2–5 cm (1–2 in) tail Habitat: Forest Diet: Grass, leaves, twigs, bulbs, tubers, seeds, nuts, and other vegetation | LC Unknown |

Genus Chionomys – Miller, 1908 – three species
| Common name | Scientific name and subspecies | Range | Size and ecology | IUCN status and estimated population |
|---|---|---|---|---|
| Caucasian snow vole | C. gud Satunin, 1909 | West-central Asia | Size: 11–13 cm (4–5 in) long, plus 5–8 cm (2–3 in) tail Habitat: Rocky areas Diet: Grass, herbs, and seeds | LC Unknown |
| European snow vole | C. nivalis (Martins, 1842) | Europe and western Asia | Size: 10–15 cm (4–6 in) long, plus 4–8 cm (2–3 in) tail Habitat: Rocky areas Diet: Grass, herbs, and seeds | LC Unknown |
| Robert's snow vole | C. roberti (Thomas, 1906) | West-central Asia | Size: 12–16 cm (5–6 in) long, plus 8–11 cm (3–4 in) tail Habitat: Forest Diet: Grass, herbs, and seeds | LC Unknown |

Genus Clethrionomys – Gistel, 1850 – five species
| Common name | Scientific name and subspecies | Range | Size and ecology | IUCN status and estimated population |
|---|---|---|---|---|
| Bank vole | C. glareolus (Schreber, 1780) | Europe and western Asia | Size: 8–14 cm (3–6 in) long, plus 3–8 cm (1–3 in) tail Habitat: Forest and shrubland Diet: Tender vegetation, nuts, seeds, bark, lichens, fungus, and insects | LC Unknown |
| Northern red-backed vole | C. rutilus (Pallas, 1779) | Northeastern Europe, northern Asia, and northwestern North America | Size: 8–13 cm (3–5 in) long, plus 2–5 cm (1–2 in) tail Habitat: Forest and grassland Diet: Tender vegetation, nuts, seeds, bark, lichens, fungi, and insects | LC Unknown |
| Southern red-backed vole | C. gapperi (Vigors, 1830) | Canada and United States | Size: 10–12 cm (4–5 in) long, plus 3–5 cm (1–2 in) tail Habitat: Forest and rocky areas Diet: Tender vegetation, nuts, seeds, bark, lichens, fungi, and insects | LC Unknown |
| Tien Shan red-backed vole | C. centralis (Miller, 1906) | Central Asia | Size: 10–12 cm (4–5 in) long, plus 4–6 cm (2 in) tail Habitat: Forest Diet: Tender vegetation, nuts, seeds, bark, lichens, fungi, and insects | LC Unknown |
| Western red-backed vole | C. californicus (Merriam, 1890) | Western United States | Size: 8–11 cm (3–4 in) long, plus 3–6 cm (1–2 in) tail Habitat: Forest Diet: Tender vegetation, nuts, seeds, bark, lichens, fungi, and insects | LC Unknown |

Genus Craseomys – Miller, 1900 – six species
| Common name | Scientific name and subspecies | Range | Size and ecology | IUCN status and estimated population |
|---|---|---|---|---|
| Grey red-backed vole | C. rufocanus (Sundevall, 1846) | Northern Europe and northern Asia | Size: 10–15 cm (4–6 in) long, plus 2–7 cm (1–3 in) tail Habitat: Forest, shrubland, grassland, inland wetlands, and rocky areas Diet: Tender vegetation, nuts, seeds, bark, lichens, fungi, and insects | LC Unknown |
| Hokkaido red-backed vole | C. rex (Imaizumi, 1971) | Japan and eastern Russia | Size: 11–15 cm (4–6 in) long, plus 4–7 cm (2–3 in) tail Habitat: Forest, shrubland, and grassland Diet: Tender vegetation, nuts, seeds, bark, lichens, fungi, and insects | LC Unknown |
| Japanese red-backed vole | C. andersoni (Thomas, 1905) | Japan | Size: 7–14 cm (3–6 in) long, plus 4–8 cm (2–3 in) tail Habitat: Inland wetlands and rocky areas Diet: Tender vegetation, nuts, seeds, bark, lichens, fungi, and insects | LC Unknown |
| Royal vole | C. regulus Thomas, 1907 | South Korea and North Korea | Size: 10–12 cm (4–5 in) long, plus 3–6 cm (1–2 in) tail Habitat: Forest, shrubland, grassland, and rocky areas Diet: Tender vegetation, nuts, seeds, bark, lichens, fungi, and insects | LC Unknown |
| Shansei vole | C. shanseius (Thomas, 1908) | Central and eastern China | Size: 9–11 cm (4 in) long, plus 2–4 cm (1–2 in) tail Habitat: Forest, shrubland, grassland, inland wetlands, and rocky areas Diet: Tender vegetation, nuts, seeds, bark, lichens, fungi, and insects | LC Unknown |
| Smith's vole | C. smithii (Thomas, 1905) | Japan | Size: 7–12 cm (3–5 in) long, plus 3–5 cm (1–2 in) tail Habitat: Forest Diet: Tender vegetation, nuts, seeds, bark, lichens, fungi, and insects | LC Unknown |

Genus Dicrostonyx – Gloger, 1841 – eight species
| Common name | Scientific name and subspecies | Range | Size and ecology | IUCN status and estimated population |
|---|---|---|---|---|
| Arctic lemming | D. torquatus (Pallas, 1778) | Northern Russia | Size: 8–14 cm (3–6 in) long, plus 1–3 cm (0.4–1.2 in) tail Habitat: Shrubland, grassland, and inland wetlands Diet: Fruit, flowers, grass, sedges, buds, twigs, and bark | LC Unknown |
| Nelson's collared lemming | D. nelsoni Merriam, 1900 | Western Alaska | Size: 12–14 cm (5–6 in) long, plus 0.5–2 cm (0.2–0.8 in) tail Habitat: Grassland Diet: Fruit, flowers, grass, sedges, buds, twigs, and bark | LC Unknown |
| Northern collared lemming | D. groenlandicus (Traill, 1823) | Northern North America | Size: 11–16 cm (4–6 in) long, plus 1–3 cm (0.4–1.2 in) tail Habitat: Grassland Diet: Fruit, flowers, grass, sedges, buds, twigs, and bark | LC Unknown |
| Ogilvie Mountains collared lemming | D. nunatakensis Youngman, 1967 | Northwestern Canada | Size: 11–12 cm (4–5 in) long, plus 1–2 cm (0.4–0.8 in) tail Habitat: Grassland Diet: Fruit, flowers, grass, sedges, buds, twigs, and bark | LC Unknown |
| Richardson's collared lemming | D. richardsoni Merriam, 1900 | North-central Canada | Size: 10–14 cm (4–6 in) long, plus 0.5–2 cm (0.2–0.8 in) tail Habitat: Shrubland, grassland, and inland wetlands Diet: Fruit, flowers, grass, sedges, buds, twigs, and bark | LC Unknown |
| Unalaska collared lemming | D. unalascensis Merriam, 1900 | Southwestern Alaska | Size: Unknown Habitat: Grassland Diet: Fruit, flowers, grass, sedges, buds, twigs, and bark | DD Unknown |
| Ungava collared lemming | D. hudsonius (Pallas, 1778) | Northeastern Canada | Size: 11–16 cm (4–6 in) long, plus 1–3 cm (0.4–1.2 in) tail Habitat: Grassland and rocky areas Diet: Fruit, flowers, grass, sedges, buds, twigs, and bark | LC Unknown |
| Wrangel lemming | D. vinogradovi (Ogniov, 1948) | Eastern Russia | Size: 11–16 cm (4–6 in) long, plus 1–3 cm (0.4–1.2 in) tail Habitat: Shrubland and grassland Diet: Fruit, flowers, grass, sedges, buds, twigs, and bark | DD Unknown |

Genus Dinaromys – Kretzoi, 1955 – one species
| Common name | Scientific name and subspecies | Range | Size and ecology | IUCN status and estimated population |
|---|---|---|---|---|
| Balkan snow vole | D. bogdanovi (Martino & Martino, 1922) | Southern Europe | Size: 13–16 cm (5–6 in) long, plus 8–11 cm (3–4 in) tail Habitat: Rocky areas Diet: Grass | VU Unknown |

Genus Ellobius – Fischer von Waldheim, 1814 – five species
| Common name | Scientific name and subspecies | Range | Size and ecology | IUCN status and estimated population |
|---|---|---|---|---|
| Alai mole vole | E. alaicus Vorontsov, Lyapunova, Zakaryan, & Ivanov, 1969 | Southern Kyrgyzstan | Size: 11–14 cm (4–6 in) long, plus 0.5–2 cm (0.2–0.8 in) tail Habitat: Unknown Diet: Bulbs, tubers, and other underground plant parts | DD Unknown |
| Northern mole vole | E. talpinus (Pallas, 1770) | Eastern Europe and west-central Asia | Size: 8–12 cm (3–5 in) long, plus 0.5–3 cm (0.2–1.2 in) tail Habitat: Grassland Diet: Bulbs, tubers, and other underground plant parts | LC Unknown |
| Southern mole vole | E. fuscocapillus (Blyth, 1843) | West-central Asia | Size: 9–15 cm (4–6 in) long, plus 0.5–2 cm (0.2–0.8 in) tail Habitat: Grassland Diet: Bulbs, tubers, and other underground plant parts | LC Unknown |
| Transcaucasian mole vole | E. lutescens (Thomas, 1897) | Western Asia | Size: 10–14 cm (4–6 in) long, plus 0.5–2 cm (0.2–0.8 in) tail Habitat: Grassland Diet: Bulbs, tubers, and other underground plant parts | LC Unknown |
| Zaisan mole vole | E. tancrei Blasius, 1884 | Central Asia | Size: 9–13 cm (4–5 in) long, plus 1–2 cm (0.4–0.8 in) tail Habitat: Shrubland, grassland, and desert Diet: Bulbs, tubers, and other underground plant parts | LC Unknown |

Genus Eolagurus – Argiropulo, 1946 – two species
| Common name | Scientific name and subspecies | Range | Size and ecology | IUCN status and estimated population |
|---|---|---|---|---|
| Przewalski's steppe lemming | E. przewalskii (Büchner, 1889) | Mongolia and northern China | Size: 12–13 cm (5 in) long, plus 0.5–2 cm (0.2–0.8 in) tail Habitat: Shrubland and grassland Diet: Bulbs, seeds, and roots | LC Unknown |
| Yellow steppe lemming | E. luteus (Eversmann, 1840) | Central Asia | Size: 13–16 cm (5–6 in) long, plus 1–3 cm (0.4–1.2 in) tail Habitat: Shrubland Diet: Bulbs, seeds, and roots | LC Unknown |

Genus Eothenomys – Miller, 1896 – eight species
| Common name | Scientific name and subspecies | Range | Size and ecology | IUCN status and estimated population |
|---|---|---|---|---|
| Chaotung vole | E. olitor (Thomas, 1911) | Southern China | Size: 8–10 cm (3–4 in) long, plus 2–4 cm (1–2 in) tail Habitat: Forest Diet: Tender vegetation, nuts, seeds, bark, lichens, fungi, and insects | LC Unknown |
| Kachin red-backed vole | E. cachinus (Thomas, 1921) | Southern China | Size: 8–14 cm (3–6 in) long, plus 3–7 cm (1–3 in) tail Habitat: Forest Diet: Tender vegetation, nuts, seeds, bark, lichens, fungi, and insects | LC Unknown |
| Pratt's vole | E. chinensis (Thomas, 1891) | Central China | Size: 10–14 cm (4–6 in) long, plus 5–8 cm (2–3 in) tail Habitat: Forest and grassland Diet: Tender vegetation, nuts, seeds, bark, lichens, fungi, and insects | LC Unknown |
| Père David's vole | E. melanogaster (H. Milne-Edwards, 1871) | Eastern Asia | Size: 7–12 cm (3–5 in) long, plus 2–6 cm (1–2 in) tail Habitat: Forest, shrubland, and grassland Diet: Tender vegetation, nuts, seeds, bark, lichens, fungi, and insects | LC Unknown |
| Southwest China vole | E. custos (Thomas, 1912) | Southern China | Size: 7–11 cm (3–4 in) long, plus 3–5 cm (1–2 in) tail Habitat: Forest, shrubland, grassland, and rocky areas Diet: Tender vegetation, nuts, seeds, bark, lichens, fungi, and insects | LC Unknown |
| Ward's red-backed vole | E. wardi (Thomas, 1912) | Southern China | Size: 9–11 cm (4 in) long, plus 4–6 cm (2 in) tail Habitat: Forest, grassland, and rocky areas Diet: Tender vegetation, nuts, seeds, bark, lichens, fungi, and insects | NT Unknown |
| Yulungshan vole | E. proditor Hinton, 1923 | Southern China | Size: 10–12 cm (4–5 in) long, plus 2–4 cm (1–2 in) tail Habitat: Grassland and rocky areas Diet: Tender vegetation, nuts, seeds, bark, lichens, fungi, and insects | DD Unknown |
| Yunnan red-backed vole | E. miletus (Thomas, 1914) | South-central China | Size: 8–14 cm (3–6 in) long, plus 3–7 cm (1–3 in) tail Habitat: Forest Diet: Tender vegetation, nuts, seeds, bark, lichens, fungi, and insects | LC Unknown |

Genus Hyperacrius – Miller, 1896 – two species
| Common name | Scientific name and subspecies | Range | Size and ecology | IUCN status and estimated population |
|---|---|---|---|---|
| Murree vole | H. wynnei (Blanford, 1881) | Northern Pakistan and western China | Size: 10–14 cm (4–6 in) long, plus 2–5 cm (1–2 in) tail Habitat: Forest and grassland Diet: Grass, stems, and roots | LC Unknown |
| True's vole | H. fertilis (True, 1894) | Northern Pakistan and western China | Size: 8–12 cm (3–5 in) long, plus 1–3 cm (0.4–1.2 in) tail Habitat: Forest, shrubland, and grassland Diet: Grass, stems, and roots | NT Unknown |

Genus Lagurus – Gloger, 1841 – one species
| Common name | Scientific name and subspecies | Range | Size and ecology | IUCN status and estimated population |
|---|---|---|---|---|
| Steppe lemming | L. lagurus (Pallas, 1773) | Eastern Europe and western, central, and eastern Asia | Size: 7–13 cm (3–5 in) long, plus 0.5–2 cm (0.2–0.8 in) tail Habitat: Shrubland and grassland Diet: Green vegetation, tubers, and bulbs | LC Unknown |

Genus Lasiopodomys – Lataste, 1887 – two species
| Common name | Scientific name and subspecies | Range | Size and ecology | IUCN status and estimated population |
|---|---|---|---|---|
| Brandt's vole | L. brandtii (Radde, 1861) | East-central Asia | Size: 10–15 cm (4–6 in) long, plus 1–3 cm (0.4–1.2 in) tail Habitat: Shrubland and grassland Diet: Grass, vegetation, and roots | LC Unknown |
| Mandarin vole | L. mandarinus (A. Milne-Edwards, 1871) | Eastern Asia | Size: 9–12 cm (4–5 in) long, plus 2–3 cm (1–1 in) tail Habitat: Grassland Diet: Grass, vegetation, and roots | LC Unknown |

Genus Lemmiscus – Thomas, 1912 – one species
| Common name | Scientific name and subspecies | Range | Size and ecology | IUCN status and estimated population |
|---|---|---|---|---|
| Sagebrush vole | L. curtatus (Cope, 1868) | Western United States and western Canada | Size: 9–12 cm (4–5 in) long, plus 1–3 cm (0.4–1.2 in) tail Habitat: Shrubland and grassland Diet: Green vegetation | LC Unknown |

Genus Lemmus – Link, 1795 – five species
| Common name | Scientific name and subspecies | Range | Size and ecology | IUCN status and estimated population |
|---|---|---|---|---|
| Amur lemming | L. amurensis Vinogradov, 1924 | Eastern Russia and northeastern China | Size: 8–12 cm (3–5 in) long, plus 1–2 cm (0.4–0.8 in) tail Habitat: Shrubland, grassland, and inland wetlands Diet: Sedges, grass, bark, leaves, berries, lichens, and roots | LC Unknown |
| Canadian lemming | L. trimucronatus (Richardson, 1825) | Eastern Russia and western North America | Size: 11–14 cm (4–6 in) long, plus 1–2 cm (0.4–0.8 in) tail Habitat: Grassland Diet: Sedges, grass, bark, leaves, berries, lichens, and roots | LC Unknown |
| Norway lemming | L. lemmus (Linnaeus, 1758) | Northern Europe and northwestern Russia | Size: 11–15 cm (4–6 in) long, plus 1–2 cm (0.4–0.8 in) tail Habitat: Shrubland, grassland, and inland wetlands Diet: Sedges, grass, bark, leaves, berries, lichens, and roots | LC Unknown |
| West Siberian lemming | L. sibiricus (Kerr, 1792) | Northern Russia | Size: 9–16 cm (4–6 in) long, plus 0.5–2 cm (0.2–0.8 in) tail Habitat: Forest, shrubland, grassland, and inland wetlands Diet: Sedges, grass, bark, leaves, berries, lichens, and roots | LC Unknown |
| Wrangel Island lemming | L. portenkoi Tchernyavsky, 1967 | Wrangel Island in northeastern Russia | Size: 9–16 cm (4–6 in) long, plus 0.5–2 cm (0.2–0.8 in) tail Habitat: Grassland Diet: Sedges, grass, bark, leaves, berries, lichens, and roots | DD Unknown |

Genus Microtus – Schrank, 1798 – 57 species
| Common name | Scientific name and subspecies | Range | Size and ecology | IUCN status and estimated population |
|---|---|---|---|---|
| Afghan vole | M. afghanus Thomas, 1912 | Central Asia | Size: 6–13 cm (2–5 in) long, plus 1–4 cm (0.4–1.6 in) tail Habitat: Shrubland, grassland, and desert Diet: Grass, leaves, twigs, bulbs, tubers, seeds, nuts, and other vegetation | LC Unknown |
| Alpine pine vole | M. multiplex (Fatio, 1905) | Southern Europe | Size: 9–11 cm (4 in) long, plus 4–5 cm (2 in) tail Habitat: Forest and grassland Diet: Grass, leaves, twigs, bulbs, tubers, seeds, nuts, and other vegetation | LC Unknown |
| Altai vole | M. obscurus Eversmann, 1841 | Southeastern Europe and western and central Asia | Size: 10–14 cm (4–6 in) long, plus 3–6 cm (1–2 in) tail Habitat: Grassland Diet: Grass, leaves, twigs, bulbs, tubers, seeds, nuts, and other vegetation | LC Unknown |
| Anatolian vole | M. anatolicus Kryštufek & Kefelioğlu, 2002 | Turkey | Size: 10–13 cm (4–5 in) long, plus 2–4 cm (1–2 in) tail Habitat: Shrubland Diet: Grass, leaves, twigs, bulbs, tubers, seeds, nuts, and other vegetation | DD Unknown |
| Beach vole | M. breweri Baird, 1858 | Muskeget Island in northeastern United States | Size: 10–14 cm (4–6 in) long, plus 3–7 cm (1–3 in) tail Habitat: Grassland and coastal marine Diet: Grass, leaves, twigs, bulbs, tubers, seeds, nuts, and other vegetation | VU Unknown |
| Bucharian vole | M. bucharensis Vinogradov, 1930 | Central Asia | Size: About 13 cm (5 in) long, plus about 4 cm (2 in) tail Habitat: Shrubland Diet: Grass, leaves, twigs, bulbs, tubers, seeds, nuts, and other vegetation | LC Unknown |
| Cabrera's vole | M. cabrerae Thomas, 1906 | Spain and Portugal | Size: 10–14 cm (4–6 in) long, plus 3–6 cm (1–2 in) tail Habitat: Forest, grassland, and inland wetlands Diet: Grass, leaves, twigs, bulbs, tubers, seeds, nuts, and other vegetation | NT Unknown |
| Calabria pine vole | M. brachycercus (Lehmann, 1961) | Southern Italy | Size: 8–10 cm (3–4 in) long, plus 2–3 cm (1–1 in) tail Habitat: Shrubland and grassland Diet: Grass, leaves, twigs, bulbs, tubers, seeds, nuts, and other vegetation | LC Unknown |
| California vole | M. californicus (Peale, 1848) | Western United States and western Mexico | Size: 11–14 cm (4–6 in) long, plus 3–6 cm (1–2 in) tail Habitat: Grassland, desert, and intertidal marine Diet: Grass, leaves, twigs, bulbs, tubers, seeds, nuts, and other vegetation | LC Unknown |
| Caspian gray vole | M. mystacinus (Filippi, 1865) | Iran | Size: 10–13 cm (4–5 in) long, plus 3–6 cm (1–2 in) tail Habitat: Forest, shrubland, and grassland Diet: Grass, leaves, twigs, bulbs, tubers, seeds, nuts, and other vegetation | LC Unknown |
| Common vole | M. arvalis (Pallas, 1778) | Europe and western Russia | Size: 9–12 cm (4–5 in) long, plus 2–4 cm (1–2 in) tail Habitat: Forest, shrubland, and grassland Diet: Grass, leaves, twigs, bulbs, tubers, seeds, nuts, and other vegetation | LC Unknown |
| Creeping vole | M. oregoni (Bachman, 1839) | Western United States and southwestern Canada | Size: 9–12 cm (4–5 in) long, plus 3–5 cm (1–2 in) tail Habitat: Forest, shrubland, and grassland Diet: Grass, leaves, twigs, bulbs, tubers, seeds, nuts, and other vegetation | LC Unknown |
| Daghestan pine vole | M. daghestanicus (Shidlovsky, 1919) | West-central Asia | Size: 9–11 cm (4 in) long, plus 3–5 cm (1–2 in) tail Habitat: Inland wetlands Diet: Grass, leaves, twigs, bulbs, tubers, seeds, nuts, and other vegetation | LC Unknown |
| Doğramaci's vole | M. dogramacii Kefelioğlu & Kryštufek, 1999 | Turkey | Size: 9–13 cm (4–5 in) long, plus 1–4 cm (0.4–1.6 in) tail Habitat: Shrubland Diet: Grass, leaves, twigs, bulbs, tubers, seeds, nuts, and other vegetation | LC Unknown |
| East European grey vole | M. rossiaemeridionalis (Ognev, 1924) | Eastern Europe and western Asia | Size: 10–13 cm (4–5 in) long, plus 3–6 cm (1–2 in) tail Habitat: Grassland and inland wetlands Diet: Grass, leaves, twigs, bulbs, tubers, seeds, nuts, and other vegetation | LC Unknown |
| Eastern meadow vole | M. pennsylvanicus (Ord, 1815) | Canada and United States | Size: 10–14 cm (4–6 in) long, plus 3–7 cm (1–3 in) tail Habitat: Forest, savanna, shrubland, grassland, and inland wetlands Diet: Grass, leaves, twigs, bulbs, tubers, seeds, nuts, and other vegetation | LC Unknown |
| European pine vole | M. subterraneus (Selys, 1836) | Europe and western Asia | Size: 7–12 cm (3–5 in) long, plus 2–5 cm (1–2 in) tail Habitat: Forest, shrubland, and rocky areas Diet: Grass, leaves, twigs, bulbs, tubers, seeds, nuts, and other vegetation | LC Unknown |
| Felten's vole | M. felteni Malec & Storch, 1963 | Southeastern Europe | Size: 8–11 cm (3–4 in) long, plus 2–4 cm (1–2 in) tail Habitat: Forest Diet: Grass, leaves, twigs, bulbs, tubers, seeds, nuts, and other vegetation | LC Unknown |
| Gerbe's vole | M. gerbei (Gerbe, 1879) | France and Spain | Size: 9–11 cm (4 in) long, plus 2–4 cm (1–2 in) tail Habitat: Forest, grassland, and rocky areas Diet: Grass, leaves, twigs, bulbs, tubers, seeds, nuts, and other vegetation | LC Unknown |
| Gray-tailed vole | M. canicaudus Miller, 1897 | Northwestern United States | Size: 10–13 cm (4–5 in) long, plus 3–5 cm (1–2 in) tail Habitat: Grassland Diet: Grass, leaves, twigs, bulbs, tubers, seeds, nuts, and other vegetation | LC Unknown |
| Guatemalan vole | M. guatemalensis Merriam, 1898 | Guatemala and southern Mexico | Size: 11–13 cm (4–5 in) long, plus 3–4 cm (1–2 in) tail Habitat: Forest Diet: Grass, leaves, twigs, bulbs, tubers, seeds, nuts, and other vegetation | NT Unknown |
| Günther's vole | M. guentheri (Danford & Alston, 1880) | Western Asia | Size: 10–13 cm (4–5 in) long, plus 2–4 cm (1–2 in) tail Habitat: Shrubland and grassland Diet: Grass, leaves, twigs, bulbs, tubers, seeds, nuts, and other vegetation | LC Unknown |
| Insular vole | M. abbreviatus Miller, 1899 | Alaska | Size: 8–15 cm (3–6 in) long, plus 1–5 cm (0.4–2.0 in) tail Habitat: Grassland Diet: Grass, leaves, twigs, bulbs, tubers, seeds, nuts, and other vegetation | LC Unknown |
| Jalapan pine vole | M. quasiater (Coues, 1874) | Eastern Mexico | Size: 9–11 cm (4 in) long, plus 1–3 cm (0.4–1.2 in) tail Habitat: Forest, grassland, and rocky areas Diet: Grass, leaves, twigs, bulbs, tubers, seeds, nuts, and other vegetation | NT Unknown |
| Juniper vole | M. yuldaschi (Sévertsov, 1879) | Central Asia | Size: 6–12 cm (2–5 in) long, plus 2–5 cm (1–2 in) tail Habitat: Forest, shrubland, and grassland Diet: Grass, leaves, twigs, bulbs, tubers, seeds, nuts, and other vegetation | LC Unknown |
| Kerman vole | M. kermanensis de Roguin, 1988 | Iran | Size: 11–16 cm (4–6 in) long, plus 4–6 cm (2 in) tail Habitat: Unknown Diet: Grass, leaves, twigs, bulbs, tubers, seeds, nuts, and other vegetation | DD Unknown |
| Liechtenstein's pine vole | M. liechtensteini (Wettstein, 1927) | Central and eastern Europe | Size: 8–12 cm (3–5 in) long, plus 2–4 cm (1–2 in) tail Habitat: Forest and grassland Diet: Grass, leaves, twigs, bulbs, tubers, seeds, nuts, and other vegetation | LC Unknown |
| Long-tailed vole | M. longicaudus (Merriam, 1888) | Western United States and western Canada | Size: 10–14 cm (4–6 in) long, plus 4–9 cm (2–4 in) tail Habitat: Forest, shrubland, grassland, and inland wetlands Diet: Grass, leaves, twigs, bulbs, tubers, seeds, nuts, and other vegetation | LC Unknown |
| Lusitanian pine vole | M. lusitanicus (Gerbe, 1879) | Southwestern Europe | Size: 8–10 cm (3–4 in) long, plus 2–4 cm (1–2 in) tail Habitat: Forest Diet: Grass, leaves, twigs, bulbs, tubers, seeds, nuts, and other vegetation | LC Unknown |
| Major's pine vole | M. majori (Thomas, 1906) | Western Asia | Size: 9–12 cm (4–5 in) long, plus 3–5 cm (1–2 in) tail Habitat: Forest, shrubland, grassland, and inland wetlands Diet: Grass, leaves, twigs, bulbs, tubers, seeds, nuts, and other vegetation | LC Unknown |
| Mediterranean field vole | M. lavernedii Crespon, 1844 | Western and central Europe | Size: 9–14 cm (4–6 in) long, plus 2–6 cm (1–2 in) tail Habitat: Shrubland, grassland, and inland wetlands Diet: Grass, leaves, twigs, bulbs, tubers, seeds, nuts, and other vegetation | LC Unknown |
| Mediterranean pine vole | M. duodecimcostatus (Selys, 1839) | Southwestern Europe | Size: 8–12 cm (3–5 in) long, plus 1–4 cm (0.4–1.6 in) tail Habitat: Shrubland Diet: Grass, leaves, twigs, bulbs, tubers, seeds, nuts, and other vegetation | LC Unknown |
| Mexican vole | M. mexicanus (Saussure, 1861) | Mexico and southwestern United States | Size: 10–13 cm (4–5 in) long, plus 2–4 cm (1–2 in) tail Habitat: Forest Diet: Grass, leaves, twigs, bulbs, tubers, seeds, nuts, and other vegetation | LC Unknown |
| Montane vole | M. montanus (Peale, 1848) | Western United States | Size: 11–16 cm (4–6 in) long, plus 2–7 cm (1–3 in) tail Habitat: Shrubland, grassland, and inland wetlands Diet: Grass, leaves, twigs, bulbs, tubers, seeds, nuts, and other vegetation | LC Unknown |
| North American water vole | M. richardsoni (Kay, 1842) | Western United States and western Canada | Size: 12–18 cm (5–7 in) long, plus 6–10 cm (2–4 in) tail Habitat: Grassland and inland wetlands Diet: Grass, leaves, twigs, bulbs, tubers, seeds, nuts, and other vegetation | LC Unknown |
| Paradox vole | M. paradoxus (Ognev & Heptner, 1928) | Turkmenistan and northeast Iran | Size: 8–13 cm (3–5 in) long, plus 2–3 cm (1–1 in) tail Habitat: Shrubland and grassland Diet: Grass, leaves, twigs, bulbs, tubers, seeds, nuts, and other vegetation | LC Unknown |
| Persian vole | M. irani Thomas, 1921 | Iran | Size: 8–13 cm (3–5 in) long, plus 2–4 cm (1–2 in) tail Habitat: Grassland Diet: Grass, leaves, twigs, bulbs, tubers, seeds, nuts, and other vegetation | VU Unknown |
| Portuguese field vole | M. rozianus Bocage, 1865 | Northern Portugal and northwestern Spain | Size: About 10 cm (4 in) long, plus about 4 cm (2 in) tail Habitat: Grassland and inland wetlands Diet: Grass, leaves, twigs, bulbs, tubers, seeds, nuts, and other vegetation | LC Unknown |
| Prairie vole | M. ochrogaster (Wagner, 1843) | South-central Canada and central United States | Size: 10–14 cm (4–6 in) long, plus 2–5 cm (1–2 in) tail Habitat: Savanna, shrubland, grassland, and inland wetlands Diet: Grass, leaves, twigs, bulbs, tubers, seeds, nuts, and other vegetation | LC Unknown |
| Qazvin vole | M. qazvinensis Golenishchev, Sablina, Borodin, & Gerasimov, 2003 | Iran | Size: 8–13 cm (3–5 in) long, plus 2–4 cm (1–2 in) tail Habitat: Shrubland and grassland Diet: Grass, leaves, twigs, bulbs, tubers, seeds, nuts, and other vegetation | LC Unknown |
| Rock vole | M. chrotorrhinus (Miller, 1894) | Eastern Canada and eastern United States | Size: 9–13 cm (4–5 in) long, plus 4–7 cm (2–3 in) tail Habitat: Forest and rocky areas Diet: Grass, leaves, twigs, bulbs, tubers, seeds, nuts, and other vegetation | LC Unknown |
| Savi's pine vole | M. savii (de Sélys-Longchamps, 1838) | Central Europe | Size: 8–10 cm (3–4 in) long, plus 2–3 cm (1–1 in) tail Habitat: Forest and shrubland Diet: Grass, leaves, twigs, bulbs, tubers, seeds, nuts, and other vegetation | LC Unknown |
| Schelkovnikov's pine vole | M. schelkovnikovi Satunin, 1907 | Azerbaijan and Iran | Size: 8–12 cm (3–5 in) long, plus 1–3 cm (0.4–1.2 in) tail Habitat: Forest Diet: Grass, leaves, twigs, bulbs, tubers, seeds, nuts, and other vegetation | LC Unknown |
| Schidlovsky's vole | M. schidlovskii Argiropulo, 1933 | Eastern Europe and Turkey | Size: 8–13 cm (3–5 in) long, plus 2–4 cm (1–2 in) tail Habitat: Grassland Diet: Grass, leaves, twigs, bulbs, tubers, seeds, nuts, and other vegetation | LC Unknown |
| Short-tailed field vole | M. agrestis (Linnaeus, 1761) | Europe and northern Asia | Size: 9–14 cm (4–6 in) long, plus 3–6 cm (1–2 in) tail Habitat: Forest, shrubland, grassland, and inland wetlands Diet: Grass, leaves, twigs, bulbs, tubers, seeds, nuts, and other vegetation | LC Unknown |
| Sicilian pine vole | M. nebrodensis Palumbo, 1868 | Sicily | Size: 9–11 cm (4 in) long, plus 1–3 cm (0–1 in) tail Habitat: Shrubland and grassland Diet: Grass, leaves, twigs, bulbs, tubers, seeds, nuts, and other vegetation | LC Unknown |
| Singing vole | M. miurus Osgood, 1901 | Alaska and northwestern Canada | Size: 8–15 cm (3–6 in) long, plus 1–5 cm (0.4–2.0 in) tail Habitat: Grassland and inland wetlands Diet: Grass, leaves, twigs, bulbs, tubers, seeds, nuts, and other vegetation | LC Unknown |
| Social vole | M. socialis (Pallas, 1773) | Central and western Asia | Size: 9–12 cm (4–5 in) long, plus 2–4 cm (1–2 in) tail Habitat: Grassland Diet: Grass, leaves, twigs, bulbs, tubers, seeds, nuts, and other vegetation | LC Unknown |
| Taiga vole | M. xanthognathus (Leach, 1815) | Alaska and northern Canada | Size: 14–18 cm (6–7 in) long, plus 4–6 cm (2 in) tail Habitat: Forest and inland wetlands Diet: Grass, leaves, twigs, bulbs, tubers, seeds, nuts, and other vegetation | LC Unknown |
| Tarabundí vole | M. oaxacensis Goodwin, 1966 | Southern Mexico | Size: 11–13 cm (4–5 in) long, plus 3–4 cm (1–2 in) tail Habitat: Forest Diet: Grass, leaves, twigs, bulbs, tubers, seeds, nuts, and other vegetation | EN Unknown |
| Tatra pine vole | M. tatricus (Kratochvíl, 1952) | Eastern Europe | Size: 8–12 cm (3–5 in) long, plus 3–5 cm (1–2 in) tail Habitat: Forest and grassland Diet: Grass, leaves, twigs, bulbs, tubers, seeds, nuts, and other vegetation | LC 200,000–250,000 |
| Thomas's pine vole | M. thomasi Barrett-Hamilton, 1903 | Southeastern Europe | Size: 7–12 cm (3–5 in) long, plus 1–3 cm (0.4–1.2 in) tail Habitat: Grassland Diet: Grass, leaves, twigs, bulbs, tubers, seeds, nuts, and other vegetation | LC Unknown |
| Tien Shan vole | M. ilaeus Thomas, 1912 | Central Asia | Size: 10–15 cm (4–6 in) long, plus 3–6 cm (1–2 in) tail Habitat: Forest, shrubland, and grassland Diet: Grass, leaves, twigs, bulbs, tubers, seeds, nuts, and other vegetation | LC Unknown |
| Townsend's vole | M. townsendii (Bachman, 1839) | Southwestern Canada and western United States | Size: 12–16 cm (5–6 in) long, plus 4–8 cm (2–3 in) tail Habitat: Grassland and inland wetlands Diet: Grass, leaves, twigs, bulbs, tubers, seeds, nuts, and other vegetation | LC Unknown |
| Transcaspian vole | M. transcaspicus Satunin, 1905 | Western Asia | Size: 9–14 cm (4–6 in) long, plus 3–6 cm (1–2 in) tail Habitat: Grassland Diet: Grass, leaves, twigs, bulbs, tubers, seeds, nuts, and other vegetation | LC Unknown |
| Woodland vole | M. pinetorum (Conte, 1830) | Eastern Canada and eastern United States | Size: 6–11 cm (2–4 in) long, plus 1–3 cm (0.4–1.2 in) tail Habitat: Forest and inland wetlands Diet: Grass, leaves, twigs, bulbs, tubers, seeds, nuts, and other vegetation | LC Unknown |
| Zempoaltépec vole | M. umbrosus Merriam, 1898 | Southern Mexico | Size: 11–14 cm (4–6 in) long, plus 4–7 cm (2–3 in) tail Habitat: Forest Diet: Grass, leaves, twigs, bulbs, tubers, seeds, nuts, and other vegetation | EN Unknown |

Genus Myopus – Miller, 1910 – one species
| Common name | Scientific name and subspecies | Range | Size and ecology | IUCN status and estimated population |
|---|---|---|---|---|
| Wood lemming | M. schisticolor (Lilljeborg, 1844) | Northern Europe and northern Asia | Size: 9–12 cm (4–5 in) long, plus 1–2 cm (0.4–0.8 in) tail Habitat: Forest and inland wetlands Diet: Moss, stems, and bark | LC Unknown |

Genus Neodon – Horsfield, 1841 – six species
| Common name | Scientific name and subspecies | Range | Size and ecology | IUCN status and estimated population |
|---|---|---|---|---|
| Chinese scrub vole | N. irene (Thomas, 1911) | Central and southern China | Size: 8–11 cm (3–4 in) long, plus 2–4 cm (1–2 in) tail Habitat: Shrubland and grassland Diet: Grass, leaves, twigs, bulbs, tubers, seeds, nuts, and other vegetation | LC Unknown |
| Clarke's vole | M. clarkei (Hinton, 1923) | Southern China | Size: 10–14 cm (4–6 in) long, plus 6–7 cm (2–3 in) tail Habitat: Forest and grassland Diet: Grass, leaves, twigs, bulbs, tubers, seeds, nuts, and other vegetation | LC Unknown |
| Forrest's mountain vole | N. forresti Hinton, 1923 | Southern China and northern Myanmar | Size: 10–14 cm (4–6 in) long, plus 3–5 cm (1–2 in) tail Habitat: Grassland and rocky areas Diet: Grass, leaves, twigs, bulbs, tubers, seeds, nuts, and other vegetation | DD Unknown |
| Linzhi mountain vole | N. linzhiensis Liu, Sun, Liu, Wang, Guo, & Murphy, 2012 | Southern China and northern Myanmar | Size: 9–12 cm (4–5 in) long, plus 2–4 cm (1–2 in) tail Habitat: Unknown Diet: Grass, leaves, twigs, bulbs, tubers, seeds, nuts, and other vegetation | LC Unknown |
| Plateau vole | N. fuscus Büchner, 1889 | Central China | Size: 9–15 cm (4–6 in) long, plus 2–5 cm (1–2 in) tail Habitat: Grassland Diet: Grass, leaves, twigs, bulbs, tubers, seeds, nuts, and other vegetation | LC Unknown |
| Sikkim mountain vole | N. sikimensis (Horsfield, 1841) | Southern China and northern Bhutan | Size: 9–13 cm (4–5 in) long, plus 3–6 cm (1–2 in) tail Habitat: Forest and grassland Diet: Grass, leaves, twigs, bulbs, tubers, seeds, nuts, and other vegetation | LC Unknown |

Genus Neofiber – True, 1884 – one species
| Common name | Scientific name and subspecies | Range | Size and ecology | IUCN status and estimated population |
|---|---|---|---|---|
| Round-tailed muskrat | N. alleni True, 1884 | Southeastern United States | Size: 18–21 cm (7–8 in) long, plus 9–17 cm (4–7 in) tail Habitat: Grassland and inland wetlands Diet: Maidencane, as well as rushes, sedges, sawgrass, and mangrove bark | LC Unknown |

Genus Ondatra – Link, 1795 – one species
| Common name | Scientific name and subspecies | Range | Size and ecology | IUCN status and estimated population |
|---|---|---|---|---|
| Muskrat | O. zibethicus (Linnaeus, 1766) | North America, Europe, and Asia | Size: 27–30 cm (11–12 in) long, plus 20–25 cm (8–10 in) tail Habitat: Inland wetlands Diet: Cattails, bulrushes, grass, and other vegetation, as well as crabs, crayfish, mussels, and small fish | LC Unknown |

Genus Phaiomys – Blyth, 1863 – one species
| Common name | Scientific name and subspecies | Range | Size and ecology | IUCN status and estimated population |
|---|---|---|---|---|
| Blyth's vole | P. leucurus (Blyth, 1863) | Western China | Size: 9–13 cm (4–5 in) long, plus 2–4 cm (1–2 in) tail Habitat: Forest, grassland, rocky areas, and shrubland Diet: Grass, leaves, twigs, bulbs, tubers, seeds, nuts, and other vegetation | LC Unknown |

Genus Phenacomys – Merriam, 1889 – two species
| Common name | Scientific name and subspecies | Range | Size and ecology | IUCN status and estimated population |
|---|---|---|---|---|
| Eastern heather vole | P. ungava (Merriam, 1889) | Canada | Size: 8–12 cm (3–5 in) long, plus 2–4 cm (1–2 in) tail Habitat: Forest and shrubland Diet: Bark, buds, heaths, forbs, berries, and seeds | LC Unknown |
| Western heather vole | P. intermedius (Merriam, 1889) | Western Canada and northwestern United States | Size: 10–12 cm (4–5 in) long, plus 2–5 cm (1–2 in) tail Habitat: Forest, shrubland, and grassland Diet: Bark, buds, heaths, forbs, berries, and seeds | LC Unknown |

Genus Proedromys – Thomas, 1911 – two species
| Common name | Scientific name and subspecies | Range | Size and ecology | IUCN status and estimated population |
|---|---|---|---|---|
| Duke of Bedford's vole | P. bedfordi Thomas, 1911 | Central China | Size: 9–13 cm (4–5 in) long, plus 3–5 cm (1–2 in) tail Habitat: Forest Diet: Grass, leaves, twigs, bulbs, tubers, seeds, nuts, and other vegetation | VU Unknown |
| Liangshan vole | P. liangshanensis (Liu, Sun, Zeng, & Zhao, 2007) | Central China | Size: 10–14 cm (4–6 in) long, plus 6–9 cm (2–4 in) tail Habitat: Forest and grassland Diet: Grass, leaves, twigs, bulbs, tubers, seeds, nuts, and other vegetation | DD Unknown |

Genus Prometheomys – Satunin, 1901 – one species
| Common name | Scientific name and subspecies | Range | Size and ecology | IUCN status and estimated population |
|---|---|---|---|---|
| Long-clawed mole vole | P. schaposchnikowi Satunin, 1901 | Western Asia | Size: 12–17 cm (5–7 in) long, plus 3–6 cm (1–2 in) tail Habitat: Grassland Diet: Green vegetation and roots | LC Unknown |

Genus Stenocranius – Kaschtschenko, 1901 – two species
| Common name | Scientific name and subspecies | Range | Size and ecology | IUCN status and estimated population |
|---|---|---|---|---|
| Narrow-headed vole | S. gregalis Pallas, 1789 | Northern Asia | Size: 8–15 cm (3–6 in) long, plus 1–5 cm (0.4–2.0 in) tail Habitat: Grassland Diet: Grass, leaves, twigs, bulbs, tubers, seeds, nuts, and other vegetation | LC Unknown |
| Radde's vole | S. raddei (Poljakov, 1881) | Northeastern Mongolia and southeastern Russia | Size: 8–15 cm (3–6 in) long, plus 1–5 cm (0.4–2.0 in) tail Habitat: Grassland Diet: Grass, leaves, twigs, bulbs, tubers, seeds, nuts, and other vegetation | LC Unknown |

Genus Synaptomys – Baird, 1857 – two species
| Common name | Scientific name and subspecies | Range | Size and ecology | IUCN status and estimated population |
|---|---|---|---|---|
| Northern bog lemming | S. borealis (Richardson, 1828) | Canada and northern United States | Size: 9–12 cm (4–5 in) long, plus 1–3 cm (0.4–1.2 in) tail Habitat: Forest, shrubland, grassland, and inland wetlands Diet: Green vegetation as well as slugs, snails, and other invertebrates | LC Unknown |
| Southern bog lemming | S. cooperi Baird, 1857 | Eastern Canada and northeastern United States | Size: 10–14 cm (4–6 in) long, plus 1–3 cm (0.4–1.2 in) tail Habitat: Forest, shrubland, grassland, and inland wetlands Diet: Green vegetation as well as slugs, snails, and other invertebrates | LC Unknown |

Genus Volemys – Zagorodnyuk, 1990 – two species
| Common name | Scientific name and subspecies | Range | Size and ecology | IUCN status and estimated population |
|---|---|---|---|---|
| Marie's vole | V. musseri (Lawrence, 1982) | Central China | Size: 9–13 cm (4–5 in) long, plus 4–8 cm (2–3 in) tail Habitat: Grassland and rocky areas Diet: Grass, leaves, twigs, bulbs, tubers, seeds, nuts, and other vegetation | DD Unknown |
| Szechuan vole | V. millicens (Thomas, 1911) | Central China | Size: 8–10 cm (3–4 in) long, plus 4–6 cm (2 in) tail Habitat: Forest Diet: Grass, leaves, twigs, bulbs, tubers, seeds, nuts, and other vegetation | NT Unknown |

== Sources ==
- Chernasky, Amy; Motis, Anna; Burgin, Connor, eds. (2023). All the Mammals of the World. Lynx Nature Books. ISBN 978-84-16728-66-4.
- Nowak, Ronald M. (1999). Walker's Mammals of the World. Vol. 2 (6th ed.). Johns Hopkins University Press. ISBN 978-0-8018-5789-8.
- Musser, Guy G.; Carleton, Michael D. (2005). Wilson, Don E.; Reeder, DeeAnn M. (eds.). Mammal Species of the World. Vol. 2 (3rd ed.). Johns Hopkins University Press. ISBN 978-0-8018-8221-0.
