= Clethrionomyini =

Scientific classification
- Domain: Eukaryota
- Kingdom: Animalia
- Phylum: Chordata
- Class: Mammalia
- Order: Rodentia
- Family: Cricetidae
- Subfamily: Arvicolinae
- Tribe: Clethrionomyini; Hooper and Hart, 1962

Genera
- Alticola; Caryomys; Eothenomys; Clethrionomys; Craseomys

Tribe of rodents

The Clethrionomyini are a tribe of forest voles in the subfamily Arvicolinae. This tribe was formerly known as Myodini, but when genus Myodes was deemed to be a junior synonym, the tribe was renamed. Species in this tribe are:

- Tribe Clethrionomyini
  - Genus Alticola - voles from Central Asia
    - Subgenus Alticola
      - White-tailed mountain vole, A. albicauda
      - Silver mountain vole, A. argentatus
      - Gobi Altai mountain vole, A. barakshin
      - Alticola kohistanicus
      - Central Kashmir vole, A. montosus
      - Lake Baikal mountain vole, A. olchonensis
      - Alticola parvidens
      - Royle's mountain vole, A. roylei
      - Mongolian silver vole, A. semicanus
      - Stolička's mountain vole, A. stoliczkanus
      - Flat-headed vole, A. strelzovi
      - Tuva silver vole, A. tuvinicus
    - Subgenus Aschizomys
      - Lemming vole, A. lemminus
      - Large-eared vole, A. macrotis
  - Genus Caryomys
    - Ganzu vole, C. eva
    - Kolan vole, C. inez
  - Genus Eothenomys - voles from East Asia
    - Kachin red-backed vole, E. cachinus
    - Pratt's vole, E. chinensis
    - Southwest China vole, E. custos
    - Père David's vole, E. melanogaster
    - Yunnan red-backed vole, E. miletus
    - Chaotung vole, E. olitor
    - Yulungshan vole, E. proditor
    - Ward's red-backed vole, E. wardi
  - Genus Clethrionomys - red-backed voles
    - Western red-backed vole, C. californicus
    - Tien Shan red-backed vole, C. centralis
    - Southern red-backed vole, C. gapperi
    - Bank vole, C. glareolus
    - Northern red-backed vole, C. rutilus
  - Genus Craseomys
    - Anderson's red-backed vole, C. andersoni
    - Imaizumi's red-backed vole, C. imaizumii
    - Korean red-backed vole, C. regulus
    - Hokkaido red-backed vole, C. rex
    - Grey red-backed vole, C. rufocanus
    - Shansei vole, C. shanseius
    - Smith's vole, C. smithii
