= List of mammals of Mongolia =

There are 121 mammal species naturally occurring in Mongolia, of which two are critically endangered, four are endangered, nine are vulnerable, and six are near threatened.

The following tags are used to highlight each species' conservation status as assessed by the International Union for Conservation of Nature:

EX	Extinct	No reasonable doubt that the last individual has died.
EW	Extinct in the wild	Known only to survive in captivity or as a naturalized populations well outside its previous range.
CR	Critically endangered	The species is in imminent risk of extinction in the wild.
EN	Endangered	The species is facing an extremely high risk of extinction in the wild.
VU	Vulnerable	The species is facing a high risk of extinction in the wild.
NT	Near threatened	The species does not meet any of the criteria that would categorise it as risking extinction but it is likely to do so in the future.
LC	Least concern	There are no current identifiable risks to the species.
DD	Data deficient	There is inadequate information to make an assessment of the risks to this species.

Some species were assessed using an earlier set of criteria. Species assessed using this system have the following instead of near threatened and least concern categories:

LR/cd	Lower risk/conservation dependent	Species which were the focus of conservation programmes and may have moved into a higher risk category if that programme was discontinued.
LR/nt	Lower risk/near threatened	Species which are close to being classified as vulnerable but are not the subject of conservation programmes.
LR/lc	Lower risk/least concern	Species for which there are no identifiable risks.

== Order: Artiodactyla (even-toed ungulates) ==
Moose

The even-toed ungulates are ungulates whose weight is borne about equally by the third and fourth toes, rather than mostly or entirely by the third as in perissodactyls. There are about 220 artiodactyl species, including many that are of great economic importance to humans.

- Family: Bovidae (cattle, antelope, sheep, goats)
  - Subfamily: Antilopinae
    - Genus: Gazella
      - Goitered gazelle, G. subgutturosa VU
    - Genus: Procapra
      - Mongolian gazelle, P. gutturosa LC
    - Genus: Saiga
      - Saiga antelope, S. tatarica CR
  - Subfamily: Caprinae
    - Genus: Capra
      - Siberian ibex, C. sibrica NT
    - Genus: Ovis
      - Argali, O. ammon NT
- Family: Camelidae (camels, llamas)
  - Genus: Camelus
    - Wild Bactrian camel, C. ferus CR
- Family: Moschidae
  - Genus: Moschus
    - Siberian musk deer, M. moschiferus VU
- Family: Cervidae (deer)
  - Subfamily: Cervinae
    - Genus: Cervus
      - Wapiti, C. canadensis LC
        - Manchurian wapiti, C. c. xanthopygus
  - Subfamily: Capreolinae
    - Genus: Alces
      - Moose, A. alces LC
    - Genus: Capreolus
      - Siberian roe deer, C. pygargus LC
    - Genus: Rangifer
      - Reindeer, R. tarandus VU
- Family: Suidae
  - Genus: Sus
    - Wild boar, S. scrofa LC

== Order: Carnivora (carnivorans) ==
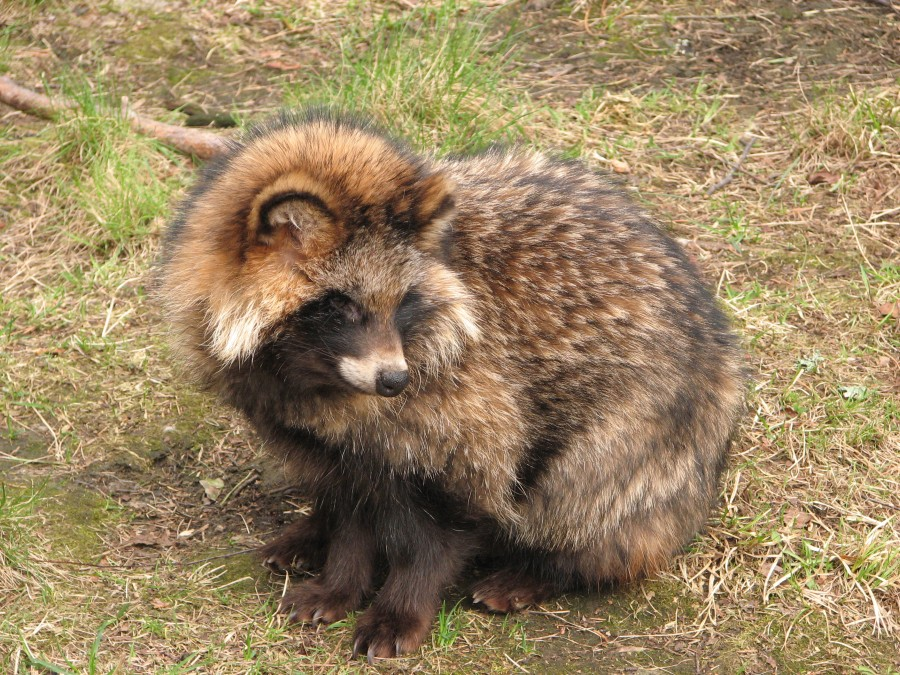
Raccoon dog

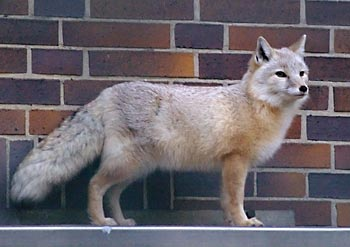
Corsac fox

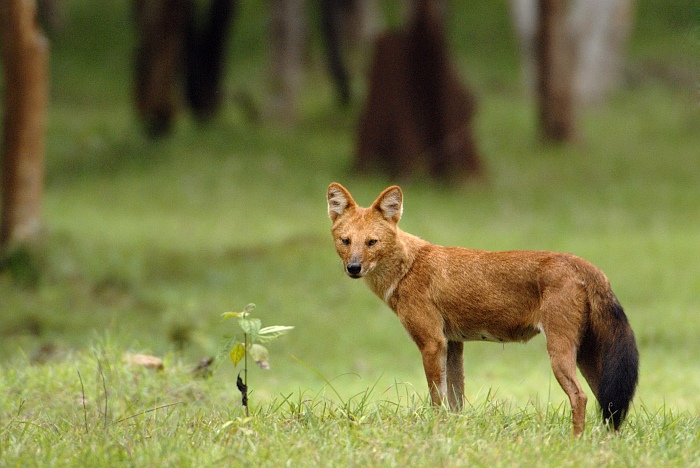
Dhole

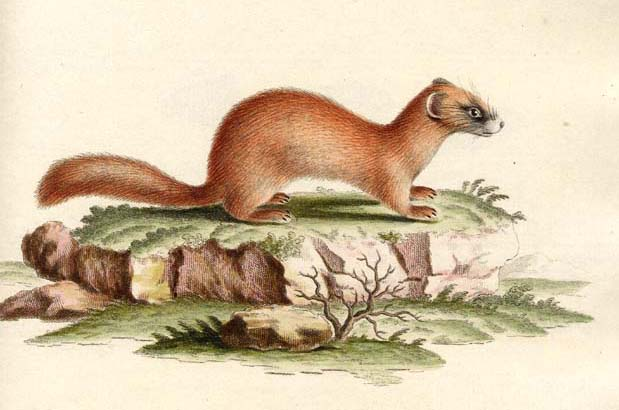
Siberian weasel

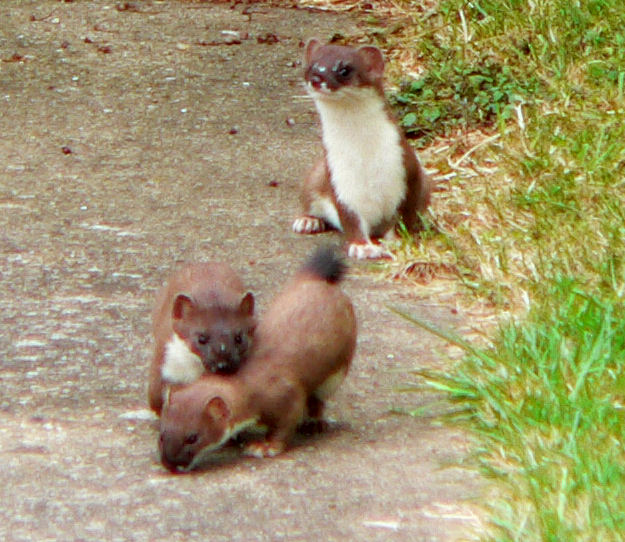
Stoat

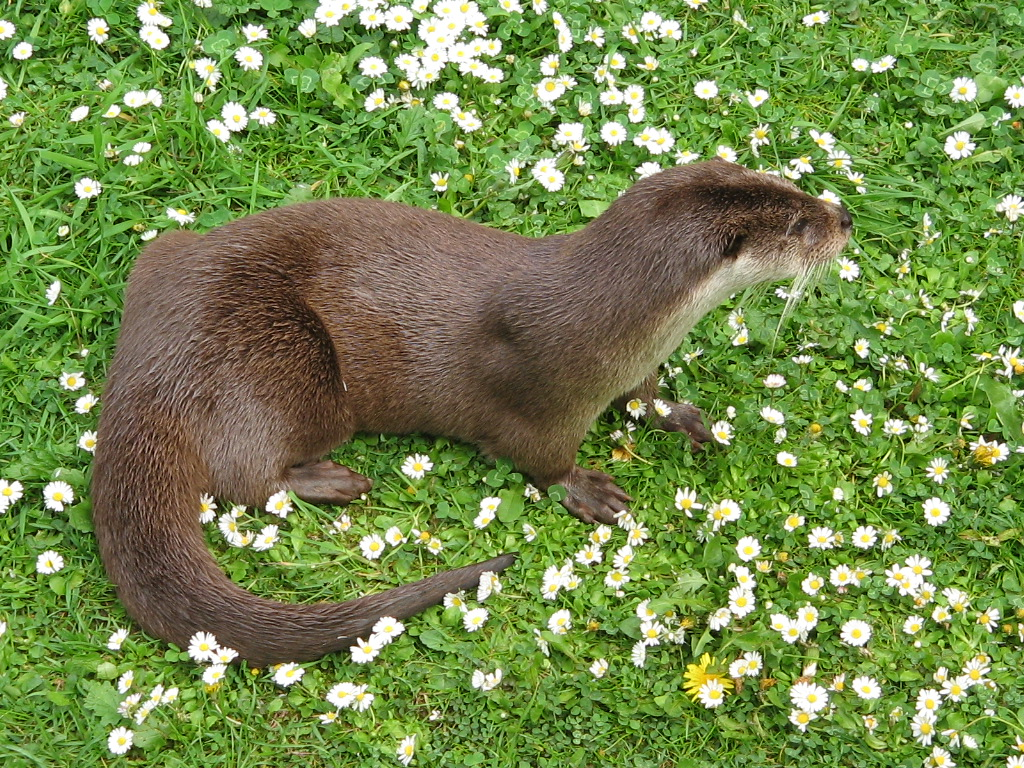
Eurasian otter

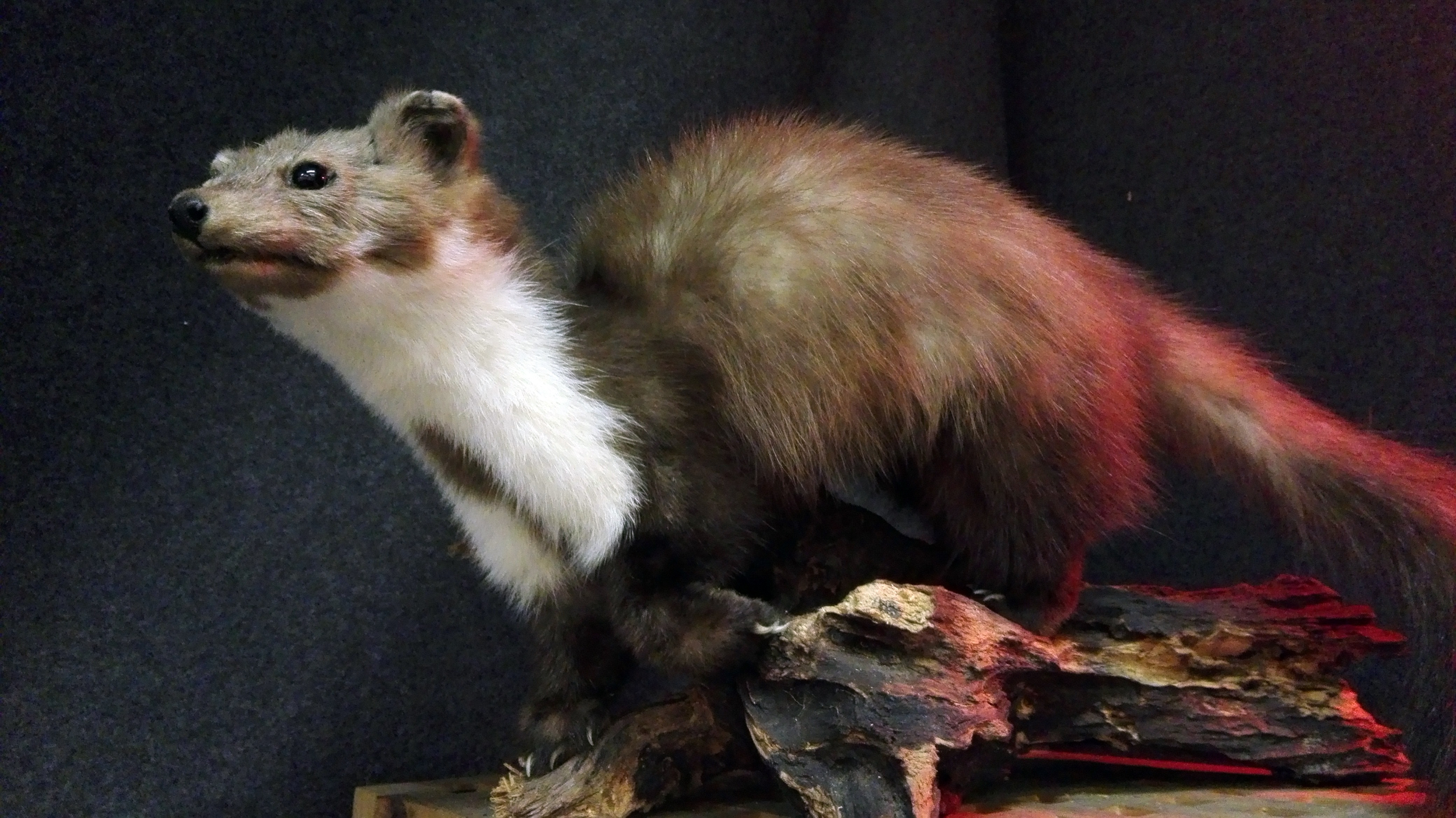
Beech marten

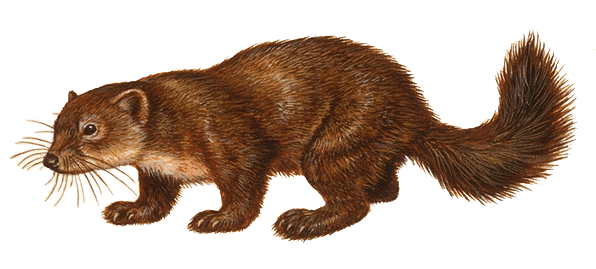
Sable

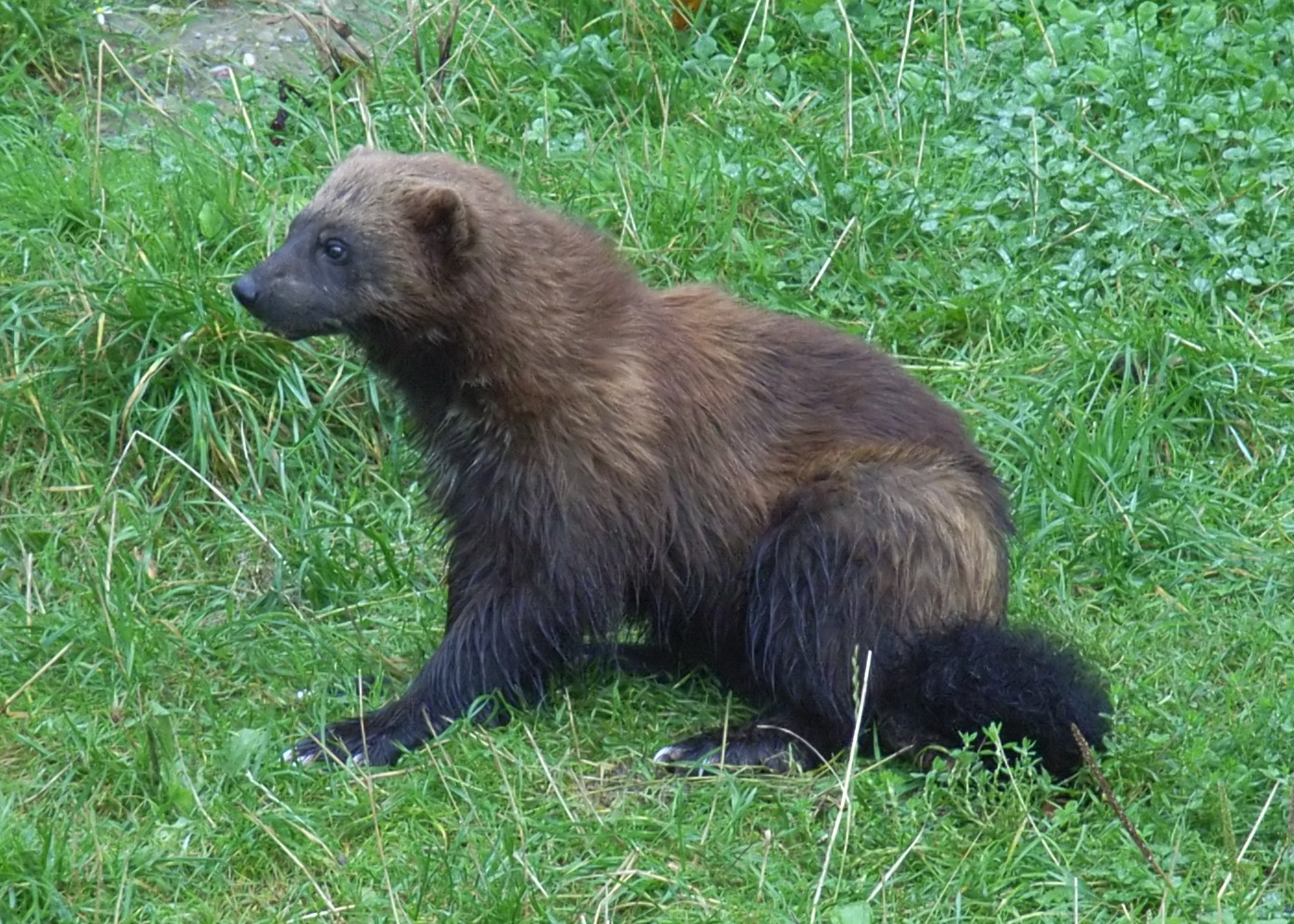
Wolverine

There are over 260 species of carnivorans, the majority of which feed primarily on meat. They have a characteristic skull shape and dentition.

- Suborder: Feliformia
  - Family: Felidae (cats)
    - Subfamily: Felinae
      - Genus: Felis
        - African wildcat, F. lybica LC
          - Asiatic wildcat, F. l. ornata
      - Genus: Lynx
        - Eurasian lynx, L. lynx LC
          - Turkestan lynx, L. l. isabellinus
      - Genus: Otocolobus
        - Pallas's cat, O. manul LC
    - Subfamily: Pantherinae
      - Genus: Panthera
        - Snow leopard, P. uncia VU
- Suborder: Caniformia
  - Family: Canidae (dogs, foxes)
    - Genus: Canis
      - Gray wolf, C. lupus LC
        - Mongolian wolf, C. l. chanco
    - Genus: Nyctereutes
      - Raccoon dog, N. procyonoides LC
    - Genus: Vulpes
      - Corsac fox, V. corsac LC
      - Red fox, V. vulpes LC
  - Family: Ursidae (bears)
    - Genus: Ursus
      - Brown bear, U. arctos LC
        - Gobi bear, U. a. gobiensis CR
  - Family: Mustelidae (mustelids)
    - Genus: Arctonyx
      - Northern hog badger, A. albogularis LC
    - Genus: Gulo
      - Wolverine, G. gulo LC
    - Genus: Lutra
      - Eurasian otter, L. lutra NT
    - Genus: Martes
      - Beech marten, M. foina LC
      - Sable, M. zibellina LC
    - Genus: Meles
      - Asian badger, M. leucurus LC
    - Genus: Mustela
      - Mountain weasel, M. altaica NT
      - Stoat, M. erminea LC
      - Steppe polecat, M. eversmannii LC
      - Least weasel, M. nivalis LC
      - Siberian weasel, M. sibirica LC
    - Genus: Vormela
      - Marbled polecat, V. peregusna VU

== Order: Chiroptera (bats) ==
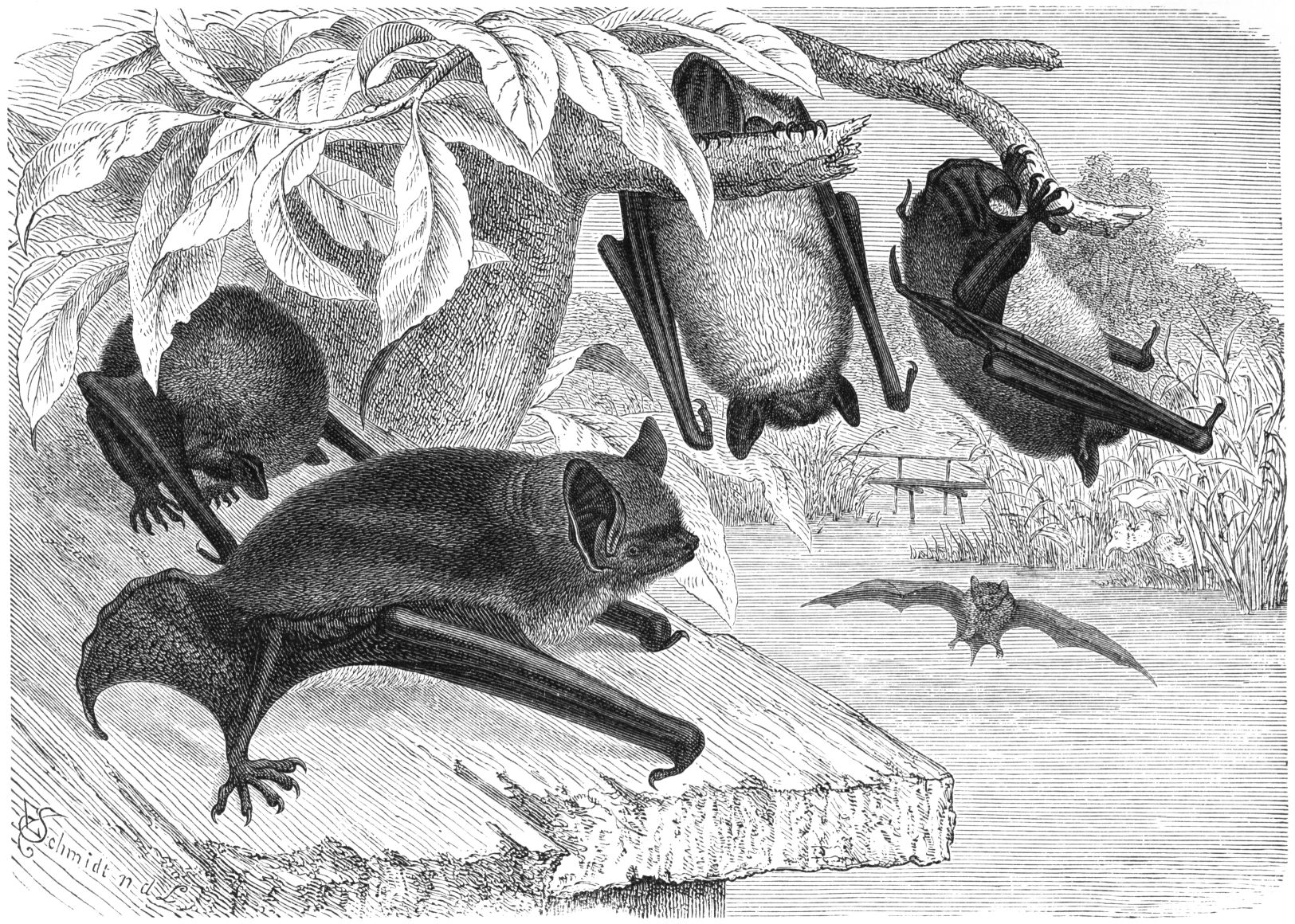
Daubenton's bat

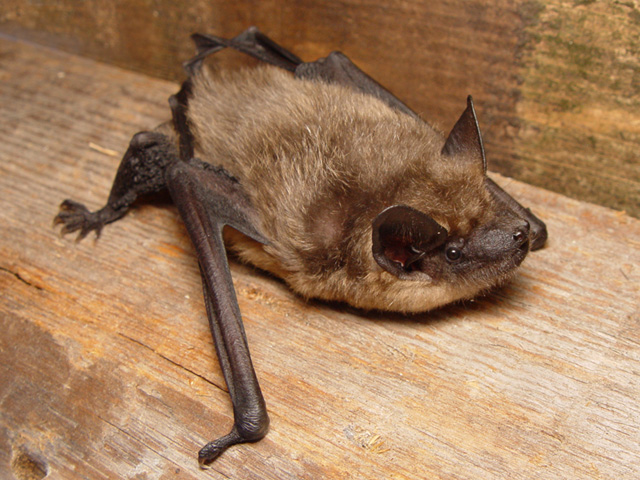
Serotine bat

The bats' most distinguishing feature is that their forelimbs are developed as wings, making them the only mammals capable of flight. Bat species account for about 20% of all mammals.

- Family: Vespertilionidae
  - Subfamily: Myotinae
    - Genus: Myotis
      - Lesser mouse-eared bat, M. blythii LC
      - Brandt's bat, M. brandti LC
      - Daubenton's bat, M. daubentonii LC
      - Ikonnikov's bat, M. ikonnikovi
      - Whiskered bat, M. mystacinus LC
      - Natterer's bat, M. nattereri LC
  - Subfamily: Vespertilioninae
    - Genus: Eptesicus
      - Botta's serotine, Eptesicus bottae LC
      - Gobi big brown bat, Eptesicus gobiensis
      - Northern bat, Eptesicus nilssoni
      - Serotine bat, Eptesicus serotinus
    - Genus: Hypsugo
      - Savi's pipistrelle, H. savii LC
    - Genus: Plecotus
      - Brown long-eared bat, Plecotus auritus
      - Grey long-eared bat, Plecotus austriacus
    - Genus: Vespertilio
      - Parti-coloured bat, Vespertilio murinus
  - Subfamily: Murininae
    - Genus: Murina
      - Greater tube-nosed bat, Murina leucogaster

== Order: Erinaceomorpha (hedgehogs and gymnures) ==
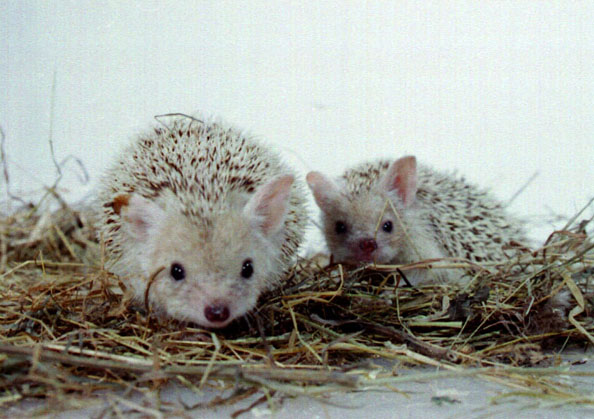
Long-eared hedgehog

The order Erinaceomorpha contains a single family, Erinaceidae, which comprise the hedgehogs and gymnures. The hedgehogs are easily recognised by their spines, while gymnures (who are not found in Mongolia) look more like large rats.

- Family: Erinaceidae (hedgehogs)
  - Subfamily: Erinaceinae
    - Genus: Hemiechinus
      - Long-eared hedgehog, H. auritus LC
    - Genus: Mesechinus
      - Daurian hedgehog, M. dauuricus LC

== Order: Lagomorpha (lagomorphs) ==
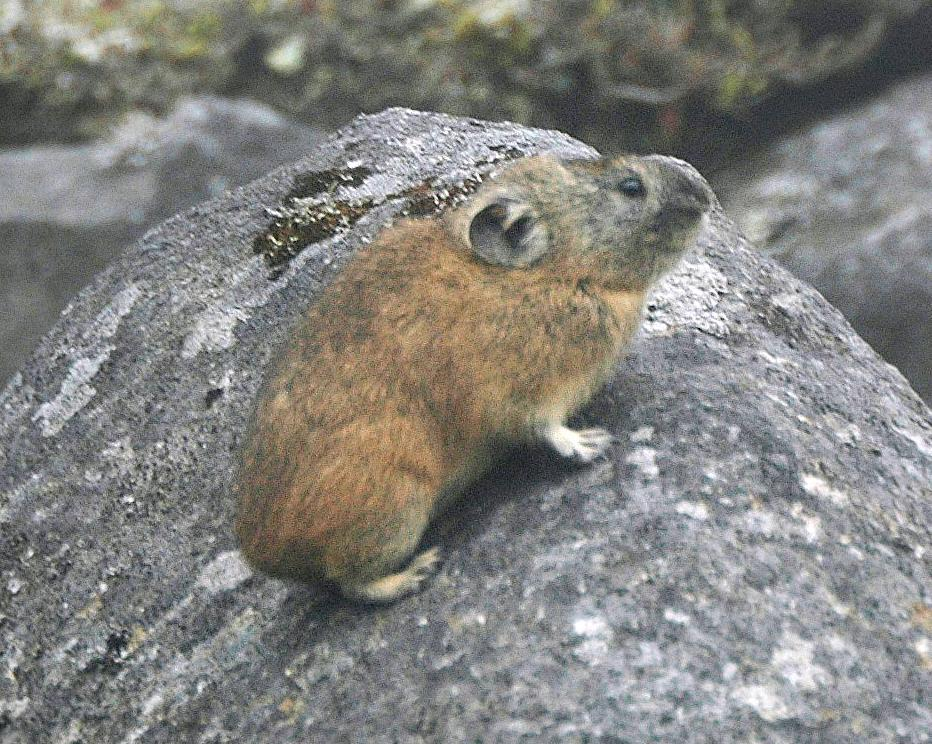
Northern pika

The lagomorphs comprise two families, Leporidae (hares and rabbits), and Ochotonidae (pikas). Though they can resemble rodents, and were classified as a superfamily in that order until the early twentieth century, they have since been considered a separate order. They differ from rodents in a number of physical characteristics, such as having four incisors in the upper jaw rather than two.

- Family: Leporidae (rabbits, hares)
  - Genus: Lepus
    - Desert hare, L. tibetanus LC
    - Mountain hare, L. timidus LC
    - Tolai hare, L. tolai LC
- Family: Ochotonidae (pikas)
  - Genus: Ochotona
    - Alpine pika, Ochotona alpina
    - Daurian pika, Ochotona dauurica
    - Hoffmann's pika, Ochotona hoffmanni VU
    - Northern pika, Ochotona hyperborea
    - Pallas's pika, Ochotona pallasi

== Order: Perissodactyla (odd-toed ungulates) ==
The odd-toed ungulates are browsing and grazing mammals. They are usually large to very large, and have relatively simple stomachs and a large middle toe.

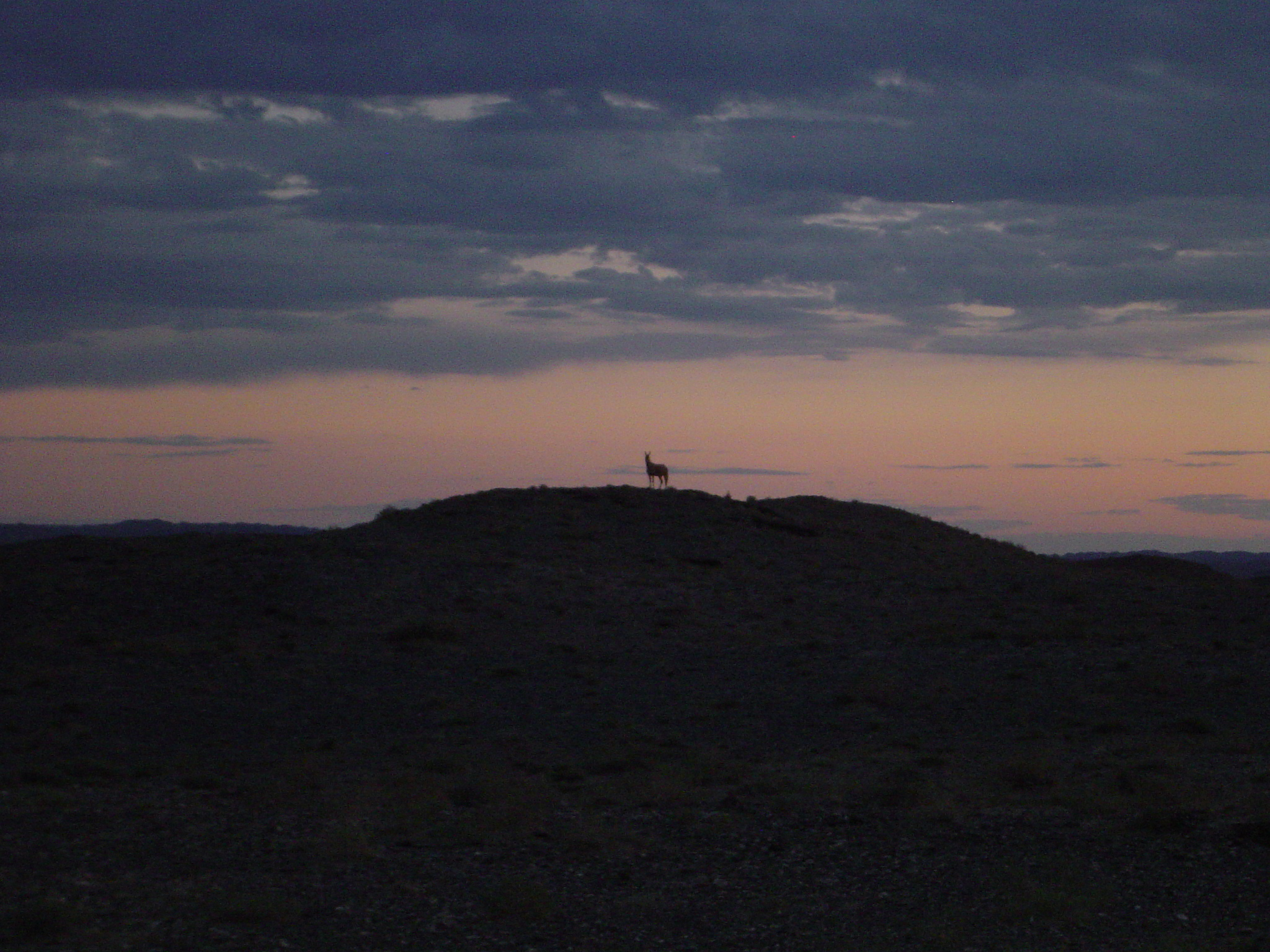
Mongolian wild ass

- Family: Equidae (horses etc.)
  - Genus: Equus
    - Wild horse, E. ferus EN reintroduced
      - Przewalski's horse, E. f. przewalskii EN reintroduced
    - Onager, E. hemionus NT
      - Mongolian wild ass, E. h. hemionus

== Order: Rodentia (rodents) ==
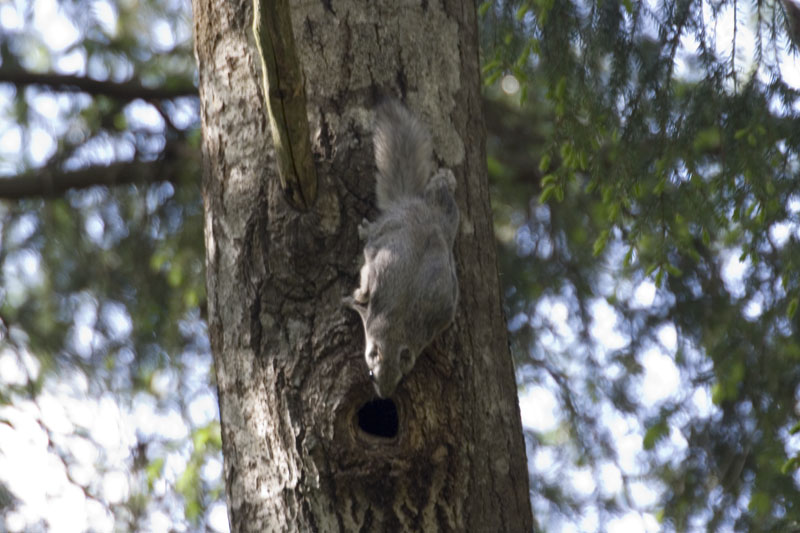
Siberian flying squirrel

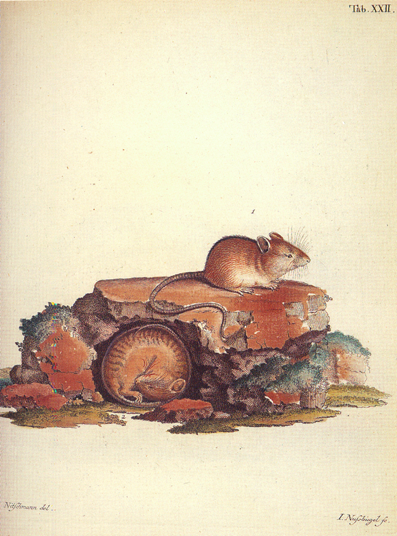
Northern birch mouse

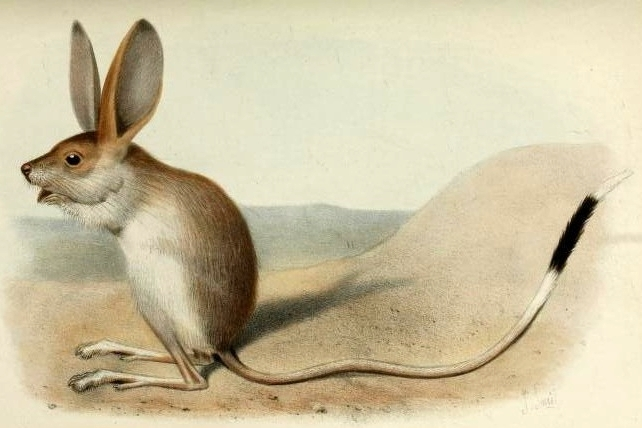
Long-eared jerboa

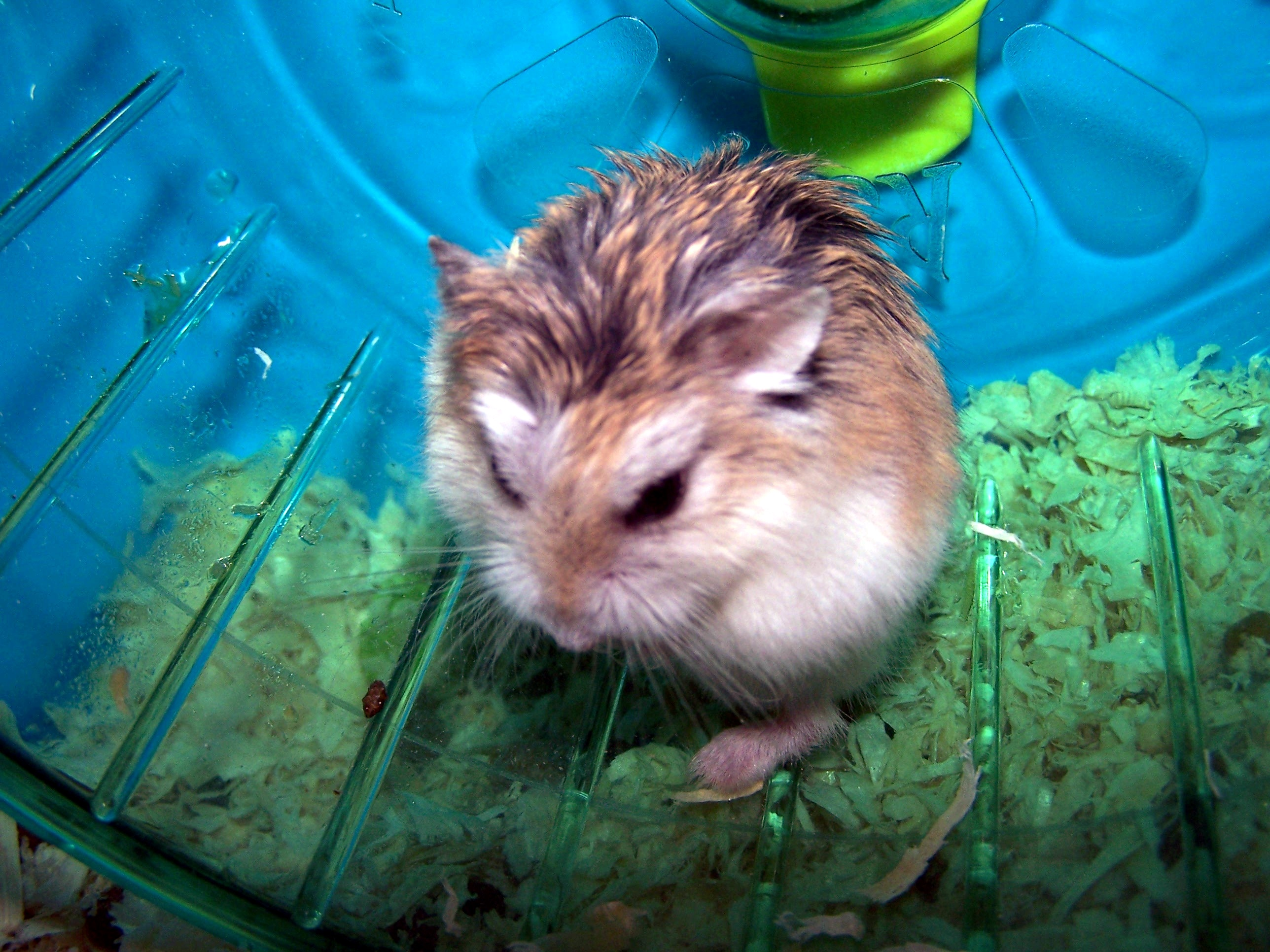
Roborovski hamster

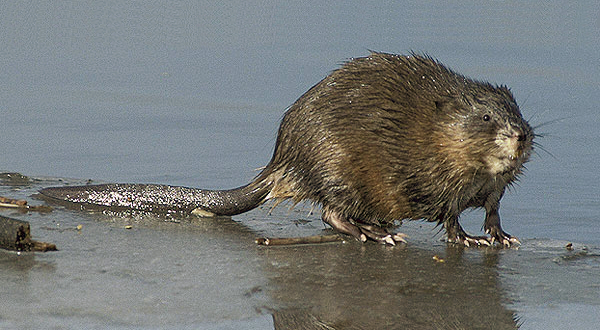
Muskrat

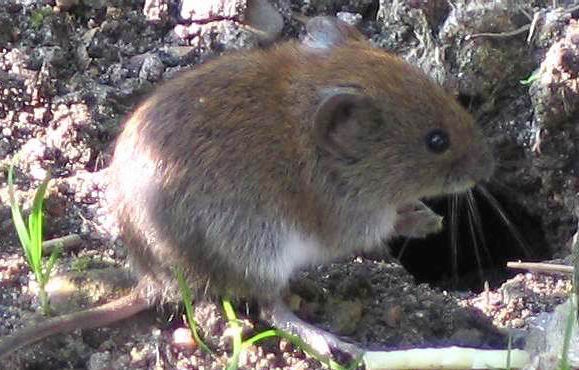
Bank vole

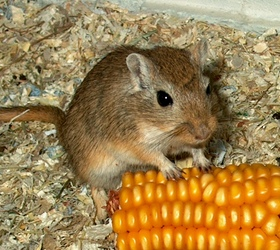
Mongolian gerbil

Rodents make up the largest order of mammals, with over 40% of mammalian species. They have two incisors in the upper and lower jaw which grow continually and must be kept short by gnawing. Most rodents are small though the capybara can weigh up to 45 kg (99 lb).

- Suborder: Sciurognathi
  - Family: Castoridae (beavers)
    - Genus: Castor
      - Eurasian beaver, C. fiber LC
  - Family: Sciuridae (squirrels)
    - Subfamily: Sciurinae
      - Tribe: Sciurini
        - Genus: Sciurus
          - Red squirrel, S. vulgaris LC
      - Tribe: Pteromyini
        - Genus: Pteromys
          - Siberian flying squirrel, Pteromys volans
    - Subfamily: Xerinae
      - Tribe: Marmotini
        - Genus: Marmota
          - Gray marmot, Marmota baibacina
          - Tarbagan marmot, Marmota sibirica
        - Genus: Spermophilus
          - Alashan ground squirrel, Spermophilus alashanicus
          - Daurian ground squirrel, Spermophilus dauricus
          - Red-cheeked ground squirrel, Spermophilus erythrogenys
          - Long-tailed ground squirrel, Spermophilus undulatus
        - Genus: Eutamias
          - Siberian chipmunk, Eutamias sibiricus
  - Family: Gliridae (dormice)
    - Subfamily: Leithiinae
      - Genus: Dryomys
        - Forest dormouse, Dryomys nitedula
  - Family: Dipodidae (jerboas)
    - Subfamily: Allactaginae
      - Genus: Allactaga
        - Balikun jerboa, Allactaga balikunica
        - Gobi jerboa, Allactaga bullata
        - Mongolian five-toed jerboa, Allactaga sibirica
      - Genus: Pygeretmus
        - Dwarf fat-tailed jerboa, Pygeretmus pumilio
    - Subfamily: Cardiocraniinae
      - Genus: Cardiocranius
        - Five-toed pygmy jerboa, Cardiocranius paradoxus VU
      - Genus: Salpingotus
        - Thick-tailed pygmy jerboa, Salpingotus crassicauda VU
        - Kozlov's pygmy jerboa, Salpingotus kozlovi
    - Subfamily: Dipodinae
      - Genus: Dipus
        - Northern three-toed jerboa, Dipus sagitta
      - Genus: Stylodipus
        - Andrews's three-toed jerboa, Stylodipus andrewsi
        - Mongolian three-toed jerboa, Stylodipus sungorus
    - Subfamily: Euchoreutinae
      - Genus: Euchoreutes
        - Long-eared jerboa, Euchoreutes naso EN
    - Subfamily: Sicistinae
      - Genus: Sicista
        - Northern birch mouse, Sicista betulina LR/nt
  - Family: Spalacidae
    - Subfamily: Myospalacinae
      - Genus: Myospalax
        - Transbaikal zokor, Myospalax psilurus LR/lc
  - Family: Cricetidae
    - Subfamily: Cricetinae
      - Genus: Allocricetulus
        - Mongolian hamster, Allocricetulus curtatus LR/lc
      - Genus: Cricetulus
        - Chinese striped hamster, Cricetulus barabensis LR/lc
        - Long-tailed dwarf hamster, Cricetulus longicaudatus LR/lc
        - Grey dwarf hamster, Cricetulus migratorius LR/nt
        - Sokolov's dwarf hamster, Cricetulus sokolovi LR/lc
      - Genus: Phodopus
        - Campbell's dwarf hamster, Phodopus campbelli LR/lc
        - Roborovski hamster, Phodopus roborovskii LR/lc
    - Subfamily: Arvicolinae
      - Genus: Alticola
        - Gobi Altai mountain vole, Alticola barakshin LR/lc
        - Large-eared vole, Alticola macrotis LR/lc
        - Mongolian silver vole, Alticola semicanus LR/lc
        - Flat-headed vole, Alticola strelzowi LR/lc
        - Tuva silver vole, Alticola tuvinicus LR/lc
      - Genus: Arvicola
        - Water vole, Arvicola terrestris LR/lc
      - Genus: Ellobius
        - Zaisan mole vole, Ellobius tancrei LR/lc
      - Genus: Eolagurus
        - Yellow steppe lemming, Eolagurus luteus LR/cd
        - Przewalski's steppe lemming, Eolagurus przewalskii LR/lc
      - Genus: Lagurus
        - Steppe lemming, Lagurus lagurus LR/lc
      - Genus: Lasiopodomys
        - Brandt's vole, Lasiopodomys brandtii LR/lc
      - Genus: Microtus
        - Field vole, Microtus agrestis LR/lc
        - Common vole, Microtus arvalis LR/lc
        - Narrow-headed vole, Microtus gregalis LR/lc
        - Lacustrine vole, Microtus limnophilus LR/lc
        - Maximowicz's vole, Microtus maximowiczii LR/lc
        - Mongolian vole, Microtus mongolicus LR/lc
        - Tundra vole, Microtus oeconomus LC
      - Genus: Clethrionomys
        - Bank vole, Clethrionomys glareolus LR/lc
        - Northern red-backed vole, Clethrionomys rutilus LR/lc
      - Genus: Craseomys
        - Grey red-backed vole, Craseomys rufocanus LR/lc
      - Genus: Myopus
        - Wood lemming, Myopus schisticolor NT
      - Genus: Ondatra
        - Muskrat, Ondatra zibethicus LR/lc introduced
  - Family: Muridae (mice, rats, voles, gerbils, hamsters, etc.)
    - Subfamily: Gerbillinae
      - Genus: Meriones
        - Midday jird, Meriones meridianus LR/lc
        - Mongolian gerbil, Meriones unguiculatus LR/lc
      - Genus: Rhombomys
        - Great gerbil, Rhombomys opimus LR/lc
    - Subfamily: Murinae
      - Genus: Apodemus
        - Korean field mouse, Apodemus peninsulae LR/lc
        - Ural field mouse, Apodemus uralensis LR/lc
      - Genus: Micromys
        - Harvest mouse, Micromys minutus LR/nt
      - Genus: Rattus
        - Brown rat, R. norvegicus LC introduced

== Order: Soricomorpha (shrews, moles, and solenodons) ==
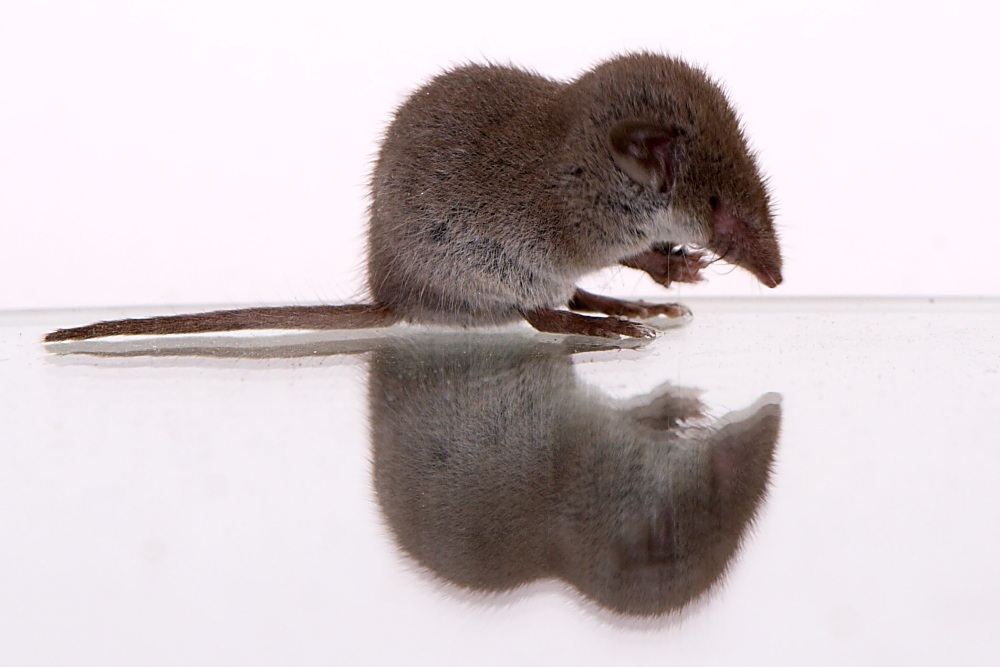
Lesser white-toothed shrew

The "shrew-forms" are insectivorous mammals. The shrews and solenodons closely resemble mice while the moles are stout-bodied burrowers.

- Family: Soricidae (shrews)
  - Subfamily: Crocidurinae
    - Genus: Crocidura
      - Siberian shrew, Crocidura sibirica LR/lc
      - Lesser white-toothed shrew, C. suaveolens LC
  - Subfamily: Soricinae
    - Tribe: Nectogalini
      - Genus: Neomys
        - Eurasian water shrew, Neomys fodiens LR/lc
    - Tribe: Soricini
      - Genus: Sorex
        - Laxmann's shrew, Sorex caecutiens LR/lc
        - Siberian large-toothed shrew, Sorex daphaenodon LR/lc
        - Eurasian least shrew, Sorex minutissimus LR/lc
        - Flat-skulled shrew, Sorex roboratus LR/lc
        - Tundra shrew, Sorex tundrensis LR/lc
- Family: Talpidae (moles)
  - Subfamily: Talpinae
    - Tribe: Talpini
      - Genus: Talpa
        - Altai mole, Talpa altaica LR/lc

== Locally extinct ==
The following species are locally extinct in the country:

- Dhole, Cuon alpinus
- Tiger, Panthera tigris

== See also ==
- List of chordate orders
- Lists of mammals by region
- List of prehistoric mammals
- Mammal classification
- List of mammals described in the 2000s
