= Lake Baikal mountain vole =

Conservation status
- Endangered (IUCN 3.1)

Scientific classification
- Kingdom: Animalia
- Phylum: Chordata
- Class: Mammalia
- Order: Rodentia
- Family: Cricetidae
- Subfamily: Arvicolinae
- Genus: Alticola
- Species: A. olchonensis

Binomial name
- Alticola olchonensis Litvinov, 1960

Synonyms
- Alticola baicalensis; Alticola tuvinicus olchonensis; Alticola argentatus olchonensis; Aschizomys olchonensis

Species of rodent

The Lake Baikal mountain vole or Olkhon mountain vole (Alticola olchonensis) is a species of rodent in the family Cricetidae. It is found principally on the Olkhon and Ogoi islands on Lake Baikal, in southern Siberia. It is also found in a small part of the bordering mainland Russia, on the Baikal coast of the Irkutsk Oblast. It was originally described as a subspecies of the silver mountain vole. Since then, it has been synonymized with A. roylei in 1978, A. tuvinicus, and A. macrotis before being reinstated as a species. It is likely a sister species to A. tuvinicus.
