= List of cricetids =

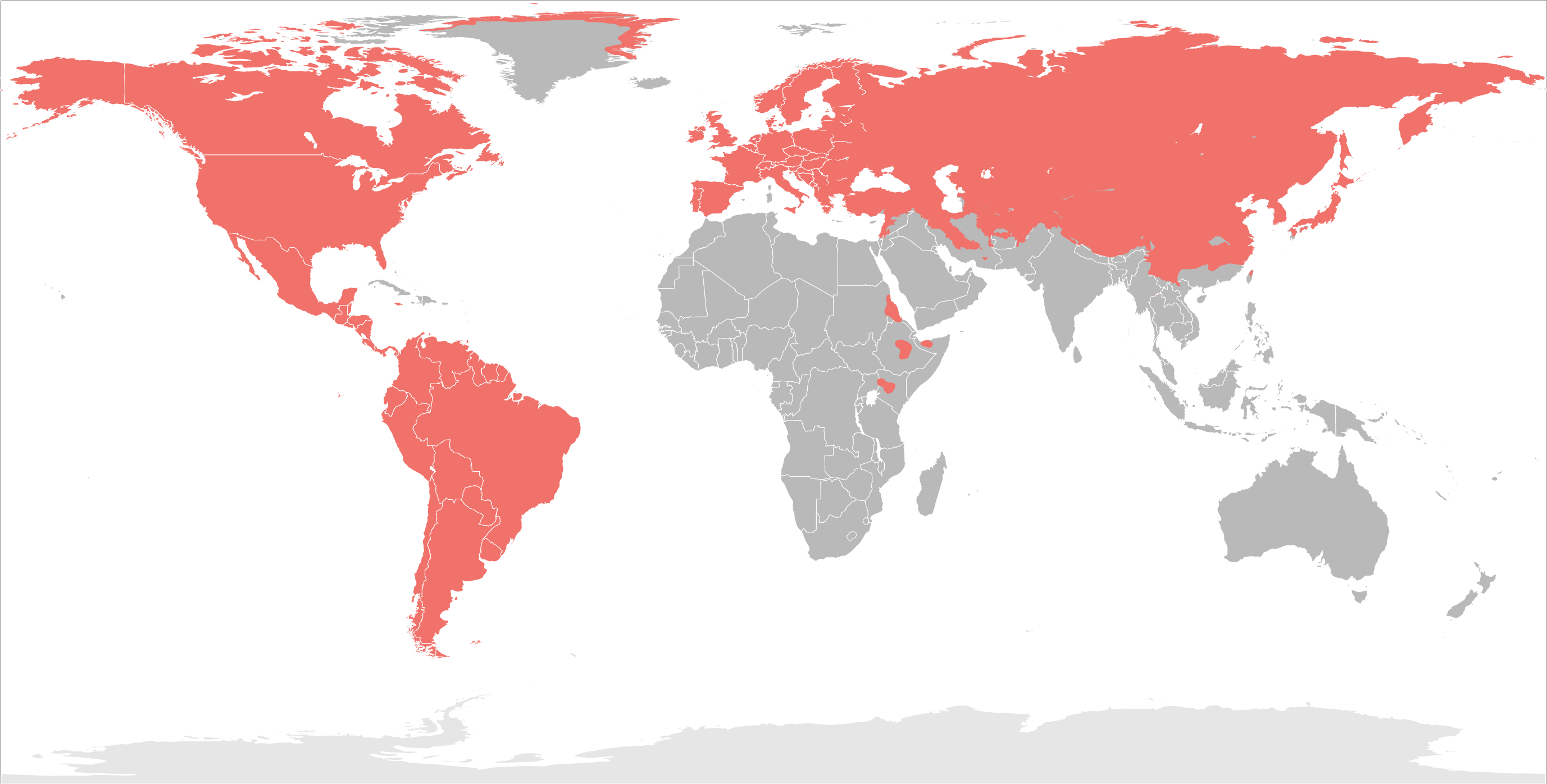
Cricetidae distribution

Cricetids (family Cricetidae) are small rodents classified in the order Rodentia. They include hamsters, voles, lemmings, muskrats, and New World rats and mice.

Cricetidae is divided into five subfamilies:

- For members of the subfamily Arvicolinae (voles, lemmings, and muskrats) see List of arvicolines
- For members of the subfamily Cricetinae (hamsters), see List of cricetines
- For members of the subfamily Neotominae (deer mice, packrats, and grasshopper mice), see List of neotomines
- For members of the subfamily Sigmodontinae (New World rats and mice), see List of sigmodontines
- For members of the subfamily Tylomyinae (vesper and climbing rats), see Tylomyinae § List of Species
