= Marie's vole =

Conservation status
- Data Deficient (IUCN 3.1)

Scientific classification
- Kingdom: Animalia
- Phylum: Chordata
- Class: Mammalia
- Order: Rodentia
- Family: Cricetidae
- Subfamily: Arvicolinae
- Genus: Volemys
- Species: V. musseri

Binomial name
- Volemys musseri (Lawrence, 1982)

Species of rodent

Marie's vole (Volemys musseri) is a species of rodent in the family Cricetidae. It is found only in China. Volemys musseri is one of two species in the genus Volemys along with the Szechuan vole (Volemys millicens).
