= Szechuan vole =

Conservation status
- Near Threatened (IUCN 3.1)

Scientific classification
- Kingdom: Animalia
- Phylum: Chordata
- Class: Mammalia
- Order: Rodentia
- Family: Cricetidae
- Subfamily: Arvicolinae
- Genus: Volemys
- Species: V. millicens

Binomial name
- Volemys millicens (Thomas, 1911)

Species of rodent

The Szechuan vole (Volemys millicens) is a species of rodent in the family Cricetidae. It is found only in northwestern Sichuan, China. It is one of two species in the genus Volemys along with Marie's vole (Volemys musseri).

== Range ==
In northwestern Sichuan, China, Volemys millicens is found in the Wolong National Nature Reserve, and likely also occurs in Wenchuan Caopo, Heishuihe, Fengtongzhai, Anzihe, and Longhixihongkou Nature Reserves.
