= Nartsiss Isaevich Litvinov =

Russian mammalogist (1927–2018)

- Born: 6 July 1927; Irkutsk, Soviet Union
- Died: 7 February 2018 (aged 90); Irkutsk, Russia
- Education: Irkutsk State University
- Known for: Systematics of the genus Alticola
- Scientific career
- Fields: Theriology
- Workplaces: Irkutsk Agricultural Institute
- Thesis: Terrestrial vertebrates of Olkhon Island (1963)

Nartsiss Isaevich Litvinov (Нарцисс Исаевич Литвинов; 6 July 1927 – 7 February 2018) was a Soviet and Russian theriologist, known for his contributions to the systematics of the rodent genus Alticola.

== Biography ==
Litvinov was born on 6 July 1927 in Irkutsk. In 1942, he completed the seven-year Fourth Secondary School in Irkutsk. He entered and graduated in 1945 from the Irkutsk Agricultural Technical School. From 1945 to 1946, he worked as a livestock technician at the Ust-Orda District Department of Agriculture.

In 1946, he entered the Faculty of Biology and Soil Science at Irkutsk State University, from which he graduated in 1951. From 1950 to 1951, he worked as a research assistant at the zoological department of the Irkutsk Anti-Plague Research Institute. After graduation, in 1951, he worked as a zoologist at the Vladivostok Anti-Plague Port Laboratory, and from 1952 to 1954, at the Kyakhta Anti-Plague Station.

On 1 September 1954, Litvinov was appointed as an assistant in the Department of Game Management at the Irkutsk Agricultural Institute, where he later became an associate professor.

In December 1962, he was appointed (and later elected) Head of the Department of Zoology, a position he held until 1980.

In June 1963, he defended his dissertation for the degree of Candidate of Biological Sciences on the topic "Terrestrial Vertebrates of Olkhon Island." On 8 January 1964, the defense was approved by the Higher Attestation Commission (VAK). On 16 September 1964, he was confirmed as Associate Professor in the Department of Zoology.

He was awarded the academic title of Professor in 1995.

Litvinov retired on 30 June 2010.

== Personal life ==
He was married to Valeria Mikhailovna, who was a senior lecturer at the Department of Botany, Irkutsk State University. They had two sons Yuri (born 1953) and Mikhail. Yuri was Doctor of Biological Sciences, Head of the Laboratory at the Institute of Systematics and Ecology, Siberian Branch of the Russian Academy of Sciences (Novosibirsk). Mikhail was Candidate of Biological Sciences, Deputy Director for Research of the Ussuri Nature Reserve.
