= Volemys =

Scientific classification
- Domain: Eukaryota
- Kingdom: Animalia
- Phylum: Chordata
- Class: Mammalia
- Order: Rodentia
- Family: Cricetidae
- Subfamily: Arvicolinae
- Tribe: Microtini
- Genus: Volemys; Zagorodnyuk, 1990

Type species
- Microtus musseri Lawrence, 1982

Species
- Volemys millicens Volemys musseri

Genus of rodents

Volemys is a small genus of rodents in the family Cricetidae. It contains the following species, both of which are endemic to China:

- Szechuan vole (Volemys millicens)
- Marie's vole (Volemys musseri)
