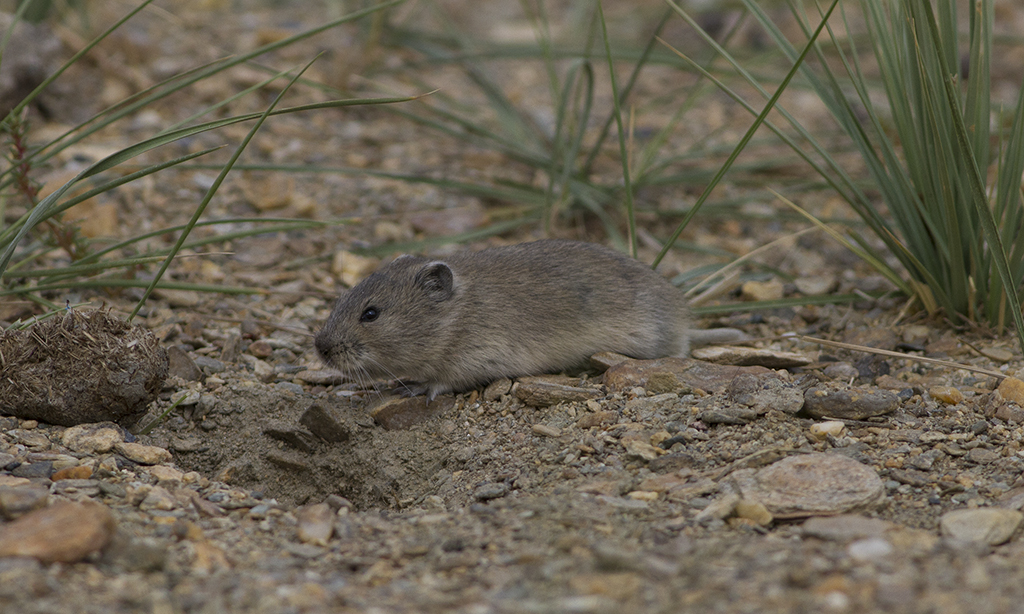
- Stolička's mountain vole from Pangong Tso, Ladakh, India

Conservation status
- Least Concern (IUCN 3.1)

Scientific classification
- Kingdom: Animalia
- Phylum: Chordata
- Class: Mammalia
- Order: Rodentia
- Family: Cricetidae
- Subfamily: Arvicolinae
- Genus: Alticola
- Species: A. stoliczkanus

Binomial name
- Alticola stoliczkanus (Blanford, 1875)

Synonyms
- Alticola stracheyi (Thomas, 1880)

= Stolička's mountain vole =

Species of rodent

Stolička's or Stoliczka's mountain vole (Alticola stoliczkanus) is a species of rodent in the family Cricetidae. It is found in China, Pakistan, India and Nepal.
