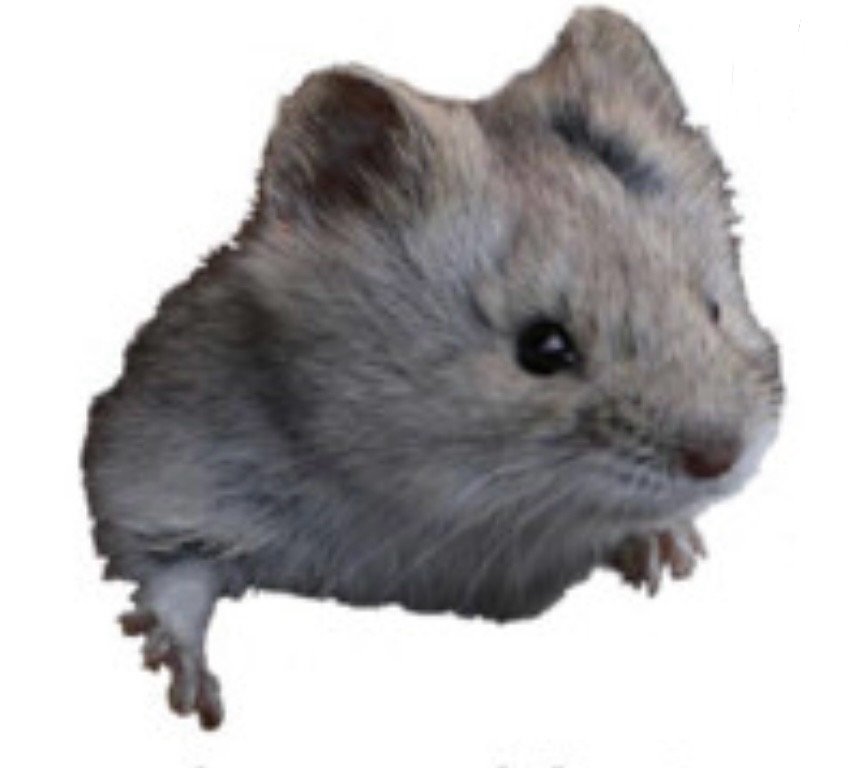

Conservation status
- Least Concern (IUCN 3.1)

Scientific classification
- Kingdom: Animalia
- Phylum: Chordata
- Class: Mammalia
- Order: Rodentia
- Family: Cricetidae
- Subfamily: Arvicolinae
- Genus: Alticola
- Species: A. lemminus

Binomial name
- Alticola lemminus (G. S. Miller, 1899)

Synonyms
- Aschizomys lemminus Eothenomys lemminus

= Lemming vole =

Species of rodent

The lemming vole (Alticola lemminus) is a species of rodent in the family Cricetidae. It is found only in the Russian Federation.
