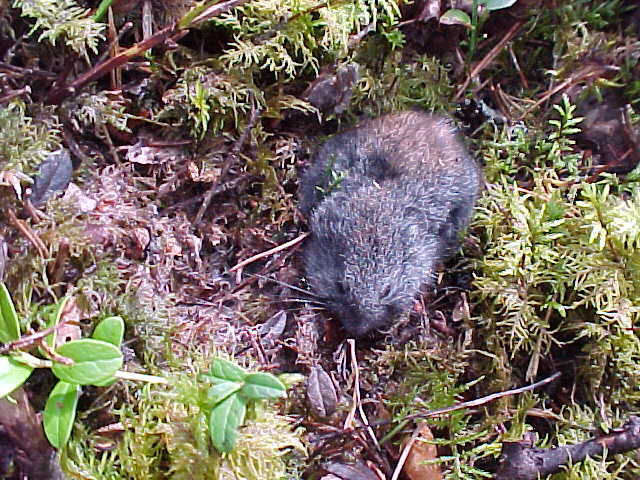
- Wood lemming camouflaged on the forest floor

Conservation status
- Least Concern (IUCN 3.1)

Scientific classification
- Kingdom: Animalia
- Phylum: Chordata
- Class: Mammalia
- Order: Rodentia
- Family: Cricetidae
- Subfamily: Arvicolinae
- Genus: Myopus; Miller, 1910
- Species: M. schisticolor

Binomial name
- Myopus schisticolor (Lilljeborg, 1844)

= Wood lemming =

Species of mammal

The wood lemming (Myopus schisticolor) is a species of rodent in the family Cricetidae. It belongs to the rodent subfamily Arvicolinae, so is a relative of the voles, lemmings, and muskrats. It is found in the taiga biome of China, Estonia, Finland, Mongolia, Norway, Russia, and Sweden.

== Sex determination ==
Wood lemmings produce about three times as many female as male offspring. This is due to an unusual genetic system where they have two different types of X chromosomes, the normal X and a mutated X*. Females with that mutation on their X*-chromosome inhibit the male determining effect of the Y chromosome. This leads to three genetic types of females: XX, X*X and X*Y and one genetic type of males XY. The X*Y females are fertile, but only produce X* ova, which means they only produce female offspring. It is not fully known the extent to which nature balances out the differences in the adult population, but sampling studies seem to suggest males do make up as little as 25% of the population at equilibrium. Females with abnormal genotype (XO, XXY, X*YY) occur regularly. The high female sex ratio may be an adaptation against local mate competition and inbreeding during population low points.

== Population dynamics ==
The population density of lemmings shows extreme peaks interspersed by years of very low densities. In peak years, wood lemmings migrate from overpopulated areas to areas of low population density. The migration usually begins around the end of July and ends in early October. The migratory distances are typically quite short, ranging a few kilometers at most, with no specific direction. If geographical features do not allow the animals to disperse evenly during their migration, then thousands of lemmings can be seen on their migration. This migratory behavior was exaggerated in popular stories about lemmings; innumerable numbers dash down the hillsides and fall down over rocks into the sea, only to drown. However, such stories of mass suicides in lemmings are mere legends. The size of home ranges between male and female wood lemmings varies greatly. Male home ranges (>2,000 m^{2} (21,500 sq ft)) are five to seven times larger than those of females.

== Diet ==
The diet of the wood lemming consists mostly of moss. The most commonly consumed species of moss are Dicranum, Polytrichum, Ptilium, and Pleurozium, with Dicranum being the moss of choice. In Northern Finland, Dicranum spp. made up the majority of the lemmings' winter food supply. These mosses are thought to be preferred because of their usability and relatively high nitrogen content. Lemmings will also eat some grass species, such as Deschampsia, as well as the leaves and stems of Vaccinium spp.

== Habitat ==
Wood lemmings can be found in areas from southern Norway to Kamchatka (taiga area of Eurasia). Their ideal habitat is a spruce forest with thick, copious moss cover. Lemmings gravitate towards areas with abundant cover from predators, i.e., holes provided by decomposed trees, stumps, and mossy rock. In the winter, wood lemmings seek out drier areas than summer.

== Activity ==
=== Metabolism ===
The wood lemming is well adapted to live in cold climates due to its high thermogenic capacity, thermal insulation, and nonshivering thermogenesis. Compared to other voles, lemmings drink greater amounts of water, which may be why they seek moister areas in the spring and summer. On average, males travel four to 12 times farther than females.

=== Reproduction ===
Breeding and reproduction usually happen in the winter months. Females reach sexual maturity at the age of 22–40 days, while males reach sexual maturity beginning around 44 days old and not before they reach a body weight of 20 grams (1 oz). Females are able to have two or three litters per year. Litter sizes usually range from three to seven young. The approximate life expectancy of a wood lemming is less than one year.
