= White-tailed mountain vole =

Conservation status
- Data Deficient (IUCN 3.1)

Scientific classification
- Kingdom: Animalia
- Phylum: Chordata
- Class: Mammalia
- Order: Rodentia
- Family: Cricetidae
- Subfamily: Arvicolinae
- Genus: Alticola
- Species: A. albicauda

Binomial name
- Alticola albicauda (F. W. True, 1894)

Species of rodent

The white-tailed mountain vole (Alticola albicauda) is a species of vole in the family Cricetidae. It is found in India and Pakistan.
