= Silver mountain vole =

Conservation status
- Least Concern (IUCN 3.1)

Scientific classification
- Kingdom: Animalia
- Phylum: Chordata
- Class: Mammalia
- Infraclass: Placentalia
- Order: Rodentia
- Family: Cricetidae
- Subfamily: Arvicolinae
- Genus: Alticola
- Species: A. argentatus

Binomial name
- Alticola argentatus (Severtzov, 1879)

Species of rodent

The silver mountain vole (Alticola argentatus) is a species of rodent in the family Cricetidae. They are distinguished by their silver-grey pelage, long vibrissae, rootless hypsodont molars and angular skull shape. Like many mammals of the Eurasian Steppe eco-region, they are well adapted to life in high altitudes, and can be found in mountain areas of Central Asia from Saur Mountains in the north-east to Kugitang Range in the west, and to Tibet and the Himalayas in the south.

== Taxonomy ==
=== Evolutionary History ===
The phylogeny and life history of the Central Asian voles within the genus Alticola are not well understood. There are three subgenera of Alticola; Alticola s.str. containing the silver mountain vole, Aschizomys and Platycranius. Through a genetic analysis of the cytochrome b gene, subgenera Alticola s str. and Platycranius have been found to form in a monophyletic clade, and have genetic differences with the Asian vole subgenera Aschisomys, with splitting of these subgenera occurring in the late Pleistocene.

== Description ==
The silvery mountain vole displays a broad spectrum of color variation, from a bright yellow to a dark brown. Color differences are thought to be correlated with a dryness gradient throughout the region and not altitude. This species' tail length varies considerably in individuals, from 32 to 51% of its body mass, and is almost hairless. The tail of this species is white in light-colored specimens and distinctly bicolored in dark animals. These voles are observed to be darkest in the fur on their back and the top of their head. Young animals start molting when they reach a body mass of 18–21 g (0.63–0.74 oz). Molting starts in March or April, and the autumn molt takes place in September or October.

Skull morphology has been found to vary in animals separated by space in this broad region. Skull length has been found to vary independently from body length. From comparative analysis in morphology, two sub populations have been found to exist; one being centered in the Tien-Shan region and a southern population being found in the Pamir-Hindu Kush mountain system. Like many rodents, the silvery mountain vole possesses hypsodont molars that are ever growing, and are adapted for feeding on fibrous material.

== Distribution and habitat ==
This vole is common in the Tien Shan and Pamir Mountains of Kazakhstan, Kyrgyzstan, Tajikistan, Afghanistan, China, and Pakistan. The northernmost part of its geographic range is in the Saur Mountains, and southernmost being the Gilgit region of Pakistan. The only fossil remains of this species come from Sel'-Ugnur in Kyrgyzstan, and are dated to the late Pleistocene. The eco-region inhabited by the silver mountain vole is the Eurasian Steppe, and is characterized by a grass cover with a predominance of low perennial grasses. These grasses are able to resist droughts and are usually low and fibrous. These botanical features has caused many small mammal species to live partially in burrows, or to find shelter within rock pilings, as in the case of the Silvery Mountain Vole.

They reside often in high mountains, in the sub-alpine and alpine biome. They also are found in low foothills and forested regions, but to a much smaller extent. They build nesting burrows in the rocks of talus slopes, and rock covered scree. They often fill in rock fissures with excrement mixed with plant debris to form an insulated wall. Nests are built as a soft sphere of plant debris, and are functionally divided into brooding nests with separate areas for rest. The silver mountain vole has been seen being active in the day and at night, and movements of the vole under winter snow have been recorded.

== Behavior ==
=== Diet ===
In winter and early spring, the silver mountain vole feeds mainly on roots of plants and on seeds, these food materials form 87–92% of their stomach composition from November to February. In March, they begin to feed on green plant vegetation, and these fresh greens form 90–99% of their stomach composition from April to September. In autumn, these animals forage for a stock of food for winter. The mass of these food reserves are not large, and range from 2–5 g (0.07–0.2 oz) to 35–42 g (1.2–1.5 oz).

=== Breeding ===
The breeding season for this species varies by altitude; in forest and subalpine zones it lasts from March to October, and there is a shortened breeding season of May to September for animals in the alpine zone. On the southern slopes of the foothills, at an altitude from 900 to 1,300 m (3,000 to 4,300 ft) the vole has been observed to breed in the winter. The young individuals appear in May in the forest and subalpine zones, and are fertile by the summer months. Normally three litters are born each year. Sexual maturity is attained at a relatively young age.

=== Disease ===
Alticola argentatus is effected by the plague, a bacterial infection caused by Yersinia pestis. It is enzootic in wild rodent populations over large rural areas of Mongolia, and has the most active natural plague foci in the westernmost regions. The marmot flea Oropsylla silantiewi is considered the primary vector for the plague. Human cases of plague have been recorded in Mongolia since 1897.
