= Tien Shan red-backed vole =

Tien Shan Red-backed Vole

Conservation status
- Least Concern (IUCN 3.1)

Scientific classification
- Kingdom: Animalia
- Phylum: Chordata
- Class: Mammalia
- Order: Rodentia
- Family: Cricetidae
- Subfamily: Arvicolinae
- Genus: Clethrionomys
- Species: C. centralis

Binomial name
- Clethrionomys centralis (Miller, 1906)

Species of rodent

The Tien Shan red-backed vole (Clethrionomys centralis) is a species of rodent in the family Cricetidae. It is found in the Tian Shan Mountains of northwestern China, southeastern Kazakhstan, and Kyrgyzstan.
