= Central Kashmir vole =

Conservation status
- Vulnerable (IUCN 3.1)

Scientific classification
- Kingdom: Animalia
- Phylum: Chordata
- Class: Mammalia
- Order: Rodentia
- Family: Cricetidae
- Subfamily: Arvicolinae
- Genus: Alticola
- Species: A. montosus

Binomial name
- Alticola montosus (F. W. True, 1894)

Species of rodent

The central Kashmir vole (Alticola montosus) is a species of rodent in the family Cricetidae. In addition to Kashmir, it is found in India and Pakistan.
