= Mongolian silver vole =

Conservation status
- Least Concern (IUCN 3.1)

Scientific classification
- Kingdom: Animalia
- Phylum: Chordata
- Class: Mammalia
- Order: Rodentia
- Family: Cricetidae
- Subfamily: Arvicolinae
- Genus: Alticola
- Species: A. semicanus

Binomial name
- Alticola semicanus (G. M. Allen, 1924)

Synonyms
- Alticola alleni Microtus worthingtoni semicanus

Species of rodent

The Mongolian silver vole (Alticola semicanus), also called the Mongolian mountain vole, is a species of rodent in the family Cricetidae. It is found mostly in Mongolia and small parts of southern Russia and northeastern China. In general, they are not crepuscular.
