= Gobi Altai mountain vole =

Conservation status
- Least Concern (IUCN 3.1)

Scientific classification
- Kingdom: Animalia
- Phylum: Chordata
- Class: Mammalia
- Order: Rodentia
- Family: Cricetidae
- Subfamily: Arvicolinae
- Genus: Alticola
- Species: A. barakshin

Binomial name
- Alticola barakshin Bannikov, 1947

Species of rodent

The Gobi Altai mountain vole (Alticola barakshin) is a species of rodent in the family Cricetidae. It can be found in China, Mongolia, and the Russian Federation.
