= Royle's mountain vole =

Conservation status
- Near Threatened (IUCN 3.1)

Scientific classification
- Kingdom: Animalia
- Phylum: Chordata
- Class: Mammalia
- Order: Rodentia
- Family: Cricetidae
- Subfamily: Arvicolinae
- Genus: Alticola
- Species: A. roylei

Binomial name
- Alticola roylei (J. E. Gray, 1842)

Species of rodent

Royle's mountain vole (Alticola roylei) is a species of rodent in the family Cricetidae. It is found in China, Nepal, Pakistan and India.
