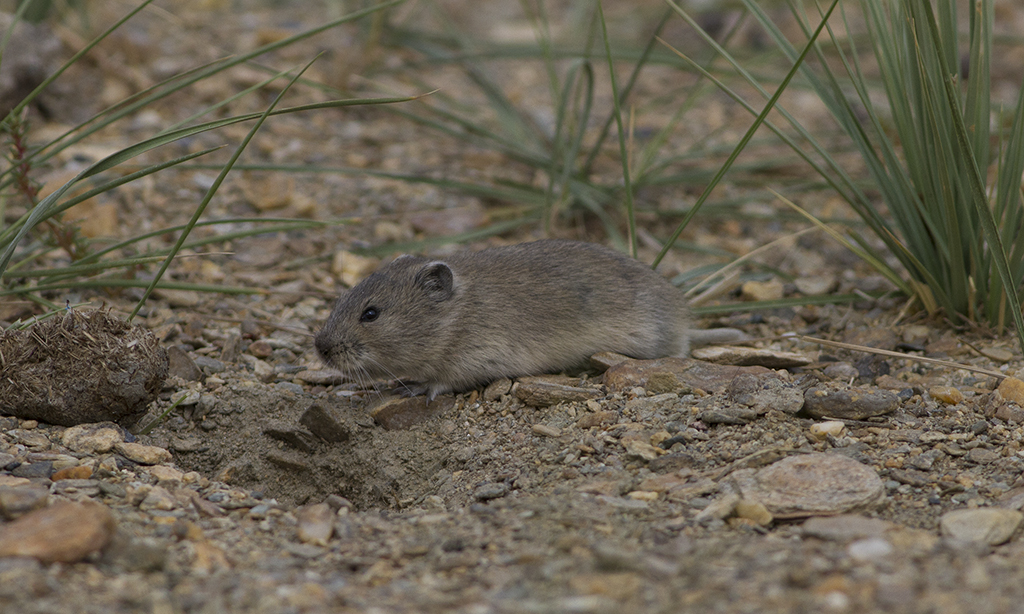
- Alticola stoliczkanus

Scientific classification
- Kingdom: Animalia
- Phylum: Chordata
- Class: Mammalia
- Infraclass: Placentalia
- Order: Rodentia
- Family: Cricetidae
- Subfamily: Arvicolinae
- Tribe: Clethrionomyini
- Genus: Alticola; Blanford, 1881

Type species
- Arvicola stoliczkanus Blanford, 1875

Species
- See article text

= Alticola =

Mountain voles Temporal range: Pleistocene to Recent

Genus of rodents

Alticola, also known as the mountain vole, is a genus of rodent in the family Cricetidae. Their fur is pale ash-brown. They prefer environments of high elevation (often in remote and extreme habitats). They are widely distributed across the mountains of Central Asia, and are found in steppe, rocky montane, and alpine forests.

They are one of the least known groups of voles in evolutionary and life history.

== Taxonomy ==
They appear to be a sister genus to the red-backed voles of genera Clethrionomys and Craseomys, based on morphological similarities. However, molecular analysis is unstable to confirm this, due to incomplete sampling of specimens and the uncertain taxonomic placement of the genera Craseomys and Phaulomys. Phaulomys is a junior synonym of Craseomys, with Alticola and Myodes (the former genus for the red-backed voles) being separate genera. It is also closely related to Eothenomys.

== Species ==
The following species are assigned to the genus:

- Subgenus Alticola
  - White-tailed mountain vole, A. albicauda
  - Silver mountain vole, A. argentatus
  - Gobi Altai mountain vole, A. barakshin
  - Alticola kohistanicus
  - Central Kashmir vole, A. montosus
  - Lake Baikal mountain vole, A. olchonensis
  - Alticola parvidens
  - Royle's mountain vole, A. roylei
  - Mongolian silver vole, A. semicanus
  - Stolička's mountain vole, A. stoliczkanus
  - Flat-headed vole, A. strelzovi
  - Tuva silver vole, A. tuvinicus
  - Alticola yarlungius
- Subgenus Aschizomys
  - Lemming vole, A. lemminus
  - Large-eared vole, A. macrotis
