= Flat-headed vole =

Conservation status
- Least Concern (IUCN 3.1)

Scientific classification
- Kingdom: Animalia
- Phylum: Chordata
- Class: Mammalia
- Order: Rodentia
- Family: Cricetidae
- Subfamily: Arvicolinae
- Genus: Alticola
- Species: A. strelzowi

Binomial name
- Alticola strelzowi (Kastchenko, 1899)

Species of rodent

The flat-headed vole (Alticola strelzowi), also called the flat-headed mountain vole or Strelzov's mountain vole, is a species of rodent in the family Cricetidae. It is found in China, Kazakhstan, Mongolia, and Russian Federation.
