= Tuva silver vole =

Conservation status
- Least Concern (IUCN 3.1)

Scientific classification
- Kingdom: Animalia
- Phylum: Chordata
- Class: Mammalia
- Order: Rodentia
- Family: Cricetidae
- Subfamily: Arvicolinae
- Genus: Alticola
- Species: A. tuvinicus

Binomial name
- Alticola tuvinicus Ognev, 1950

Synonyms
- Alticola khubsugulensis Alticola kosogol

Species of rodent

The Tuva silver vole (Alticola tuvinicus) is a species of rodent in the family Cricetidae. It is found in Mongolia and Russian Federation.
