= Large-eared vole =

Conservation status
- Least Concern (IUCN 3.1)

Scientific classification
- Kingdom: Animalia
- Phylum: Chordata
- Class: Mammalia
- Order: Rodentia
- Family: Cricetidae
- Subfamily: Arvicolinae
- Genus: Alticola
- Species: A. macrotis

Binomial name
- Alticola macrotis (Radde, 1862)

Synonyms
- Alticola altaica Alticola fetisovi Alticola macrotis vicina Alticola vinogradovi

Species of rodent

The large-eared vole (Alticola macrotis) is a species of rodent in the family Cricetidae. It is found in Mongolia and the Russian Federation.
