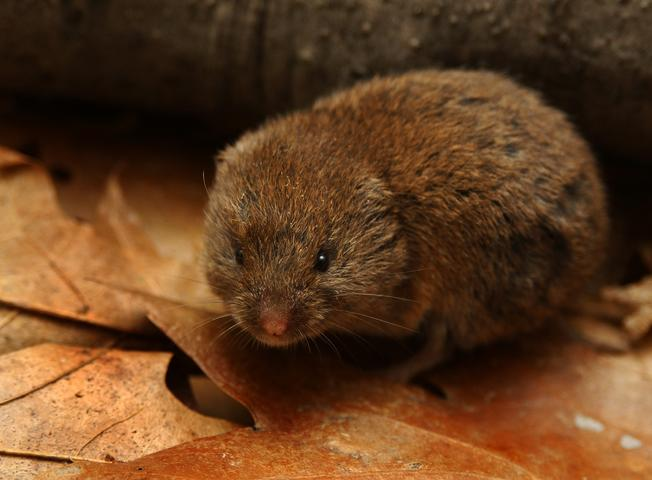
- Microtus pinetorum

Scientific classification
- Kingdom: Animalia
- Phylum: Chordata
- Class: Mammalia
- Order: Rodentia
- Family: Cricetidae
- Subfamily: Arvicolinae
- Tribe: Microtini

Genera
- Alexandromys; Chionomys; Hyperacrius; Lasiopodomys; Lemmiscus; Microtus; Mictomicrotus; Neodon; Proedromys; Stenocranius; Volemys

= Microtini =

Tribe of rodents

Microtini is a tribe of voles in the subfamily Arvicolinae.

Most members of this tribe were once placed in Arvicolini, but a 2021 study found that Arvicola is distinct from the other extant genera in Arvicolini, instead being sister to the tribe Lagurini. The current species listing of the American Society of Mammalogists lists only Arvicola in Arvicolini, with all other extant members being removed to Microtini.

== List of species ==
- Tribe Microtini
  - Genus Alexandromys
    - Alpine vole (Alexandromys alpinus) split off from A. mongolicus
    - Evorsk vole (Alexandromys evoronensis)
    - Reed vole (Alexandromys fortis)
    - Taiwan vole (Alexandromys kikuchii)
    - Lacustrine vole (Alexandromys limnophilus)
    - Maximowicz's vole (Alexandromys maximowiczii)
    - Middendorff's vole (Alexandromys middendorffi)
    - Mongolian vole (Alexandromys mongolicus)
    - Japanese grass vole (Alexandromys montebelli)
    - Muya Valley vole (Alexandromys mujanensis)
    - Tundra vole or root vole (Alexandromys oeconomus)
    - Sakhalin vole (Alexandromys sachalinensis)
    - Shantar vole (Alexandromys shantaricus) split off from A. maximowiczii
  - Genus Chionomys - snow voles
    - Caucasian snow vole, Chionomys gud
    - European snow vole, Chionomys nivalis
    - Robert's snow vole, Chionomys roberti
    - Lazistan snow vole (Chionomys lasistanius) split from C. gud
    - Stekolnikov's snow vole (Chionomys stekolnikovi) recently described
  - Genus Hyperacrius - voles from Pakistan
    - True's vole, Hyperacrius fertilis
    - Murree vole, Hyperacrius wynnei
  - Genus Lasiopodomys
    - Brandt's vole, Lasiopodomys brandtii
    - Mandarin vole, Lasiopodomys mandarinus
  - Genus Lemmiscus
    - Sagebrush vole, Lemmiscus curtatus
  - Genus Microtus - voles
    - Insular vole, M. abbreviatus
    - California vole, M. californicus
    - Rock vole, M. chrotorrhinus
    - Long-tailed vole, M. longicaudus
    - Mexican vole, M. mexicanus
    - Singing vole, M. miurus
    - North American water vole, M. richardsoni
    - Zempoaltépec vole, M. umbrosus
    - Taiga vole, M. xanthognathus
    - Subgenus Microtus
      - Field vole, M. agrestis
      - Anatolian vole, M. anatolicus
      - Common vole, M. arvalis
      - Cabrera's vole, M. cabrerae
      - Doğramaci's vole, M. dogramacii
      - Elbeyli vole, M. elbeyli
      - Günther's vole, M. guentheri
      - Harting's vole, M. hartingii
      - Tien Shan vole, M. ilaeus
      - Persian vole, M. irani
      - Mediterranean field vole, M. lavernedii
      - Turkish vole, M. lydius
      - Kerman vole, M. kermanensis
      - Southern vole, M. levis
      - Paradox vole, M. paradoxus
      - Qazvin vole, M. qazvinensis
      - Portuguese field vole, M. rosianus
      - Schidlovsky's vole, M. schidlovskii
      - Social vole, M. socialis
      - European pine vole, M. subterraneus
      - Transcaspian vole, M. transcaspicus
    - Subgenus Blanfordimys
      - Afghan vole, M. afghanus
      - Bucharian vole, M. bucharicus
      - Juniper vole, M. juldaschi
    - Subgenus Terricola
      - Bavarian pine vole, M. bavaricus
      - Calabria pine vole, M. brachycercus
      - Daghestan pine vole, M. daghestanicus
      - Mediterranean pine vole, M. duodecimcostatus
      - Felten's vole, M. felteni
      - Liechtenstein's pine vole, M. liechtensteini
      - Lusitanian pine vole, M. lusitanicus
      - Major's pine vole, M. majori
      - Alpine pine vole, M. multiplex
      - Sicilian pine vole, M. nebrodensis
      - Savi's pine vole, M. savii
      - Tatra pine vole, M. tatricus
      - Thomas's pine vole, M. thomasi
    - Subgenus Mynomes
      - Gray-tailed vole, M. canicaudus
      - Western meadow vole, M. drummondi
      - Florida salt marsh vole, M. dukecampbelli
      - Montane vole, M. montanus
      - Creeping vole, M. oregoni
      - Eastern meadow vole, M. pennsylvanicus
      - Townsend's vole, M. townsendii
    - Subgenus Pitymys
      - Guatemalan vole, M. guatemalensis
      - Tarabundí vole, M. oaxacensis
      - Woodland vole, M. pinetorum
      - Jalapan pine vole, M. quasiater
    - Subgenus Pedomys
      - Prairie vole, M. ochrogaster
    - Subgenus Hyrcanicola
      - Schelkovnikov's pine vole, M. schelkovnikovi
  - Genus Mictomicrotus
    - Liangshan vole, Mictomicrotus liangshanensis
  - Genus Neodon - mountain voles
    - Bershula mountain vole (Neodon bershulaensis)
    - Bomi mountain vole (Neodon bomiensis)
    - Chayu mountain vole (Neodon chayuensis)
    - Clarke's vole (Neodon clarkei)
    - Forrest's mountain vole (Neodon forresti)
    - Plateau vole (Neodon fuscus)
    - Chinese scrub vole (Neodon irene)
    - Blyth's vole (Neodon leucurus)
    - Liao Rui's mountain vole (Neodon liaoruii)
    - Linzhi mountain vole (Neodon linzhiensis)
    - Medog mountain vole (Neodon medogensis)
    - Namchabarwa mountain vole (Neodon namchabarwaensis)
    - Nepalese mountain vole (Neodon nepalensis)
    - Nyalam mountain vole (Neodon nyalamensis)
    - Shergyla mountain vole (Neodon shergylaensis)
    - Sikkim mountain vole (Neodon sikimensis)
  - Genus Proedromys
    - Duke of Bedford's vole (Proedromys bedfordi)
  - Genus Stenocranius
    - Narrow-headed vole (Stenocranius gregalis)
    - Radde's vole (Stenocranius raddei)
  - Genus Volemys
    - Szechuan vole (Volemys millicens)
    - Marie's vole (Volemys musseri)
