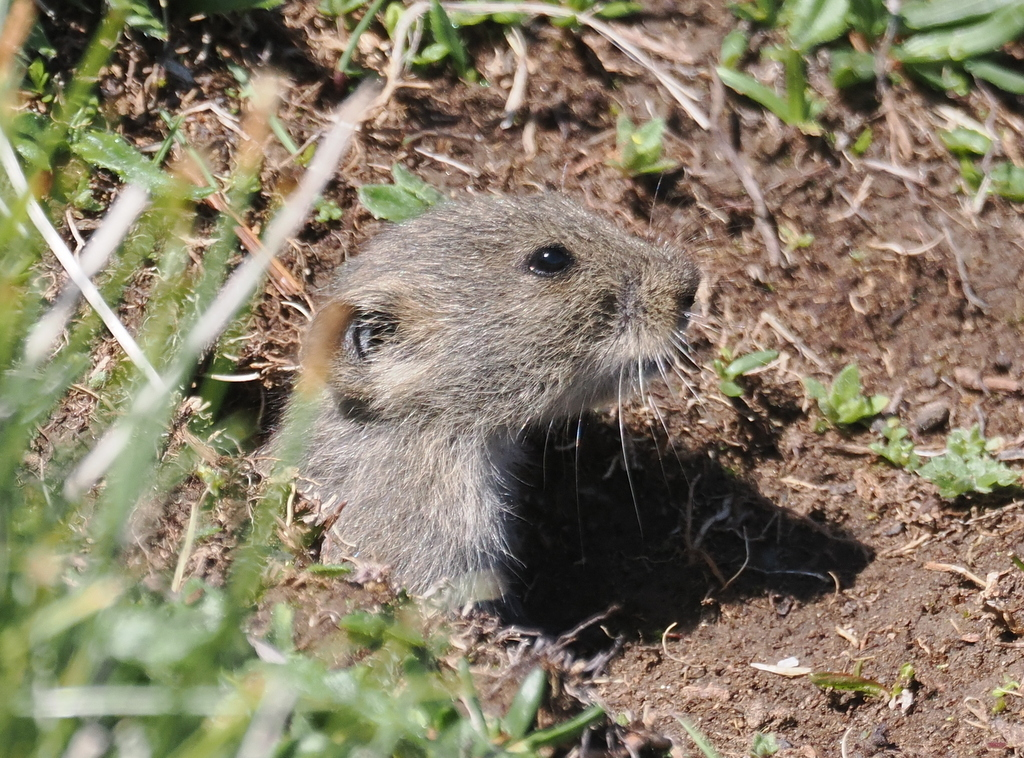
- Madoi County, Golog Tibetan Autonomous Prefecture, Qinghai, China

Conservation status
- Least Concern (IUCN 3.1)

Scientific classification
- Kingdom: Animalia
- Phylum: Chordata
- Class: Mammalia
- Infraclass: Placentalia
- Order: Rodentia
- Family: Cricetidae
- Subfamily: Arvicolinae
- Genus: Neodon
- Species: N. fuscus

Binomial name
- Neodon fuscus (Büchner, 1889)

Synonyms
- Microtus strauchi var. fuscus Büchner, 1890; Microtus fuscus G. S. Miller, 1896; Phaiomys fuscus Ellerman, 1941; Microtus leucurus fuscus Ellerman & Morrison-Scott, 1951; Lasiopodomys fuscus Musser & Carleton, 1993

= Plateau vole =

Species of rodent

The plateau vole (Neodon fuscus), also known as the smokey vole, Smoky Mountain vole, or the Qinghai vole, is a species of rodent found on the grasslands of the Tibetan Plateau in the Qinghai province of China. It is a grayish brown to yellow-coloured vole that eats plants and lives in large colonies. It belongs to the family Cricetidae, which includes true hamsters, voles, lemmings, muskrats, and New World rats and mice.

Plateau voles measure up to 15 centimetres (5.9 inches) long, plus a 2-to-4 cm (0.8-to-1.6 in) tail. They are closely related to several other voles found in China, including Blyth's vole. Because they inhabit regions at high elevations—from 3,700 to 4,800 metres (12,100 to 15,700 feet)—plateau voles have several adaptations that help them deal with lower concentrations of oxygen in the environment, which can induce hypoxia. These include the production of additional hemoglobin to transport oxygen in the bloodstream and switching from metabolizing fatty acids over to glucose.

Several parasites are known to affect the plateau vole, and it is thought to be impacted by poisoning across the Tibetan Plateau aimed towards small mammals, but these and other potential threats are not well studied. The vole is present in Sanjiangyuan National Park, a protected area. It is a least-concern species, according to the International Union for Conservation of Nature Red List and the China Species Red List.

== Taxonomy and etymology ==
The plateau vole was first described in 1889 as Microtus strauchi var. fuscus by the Russian zoologist Eugen Buchner, whose work was published in an analysis of Nikolay Przhevalsky's expeditions in Central Asia. Buchner considered the vole as a variant of Blyth's vole (Neodon leucurus, then known as Microtus strauchi). He described the specimens, which were found by Przhevalsky in 1884 at the headwaters of the Yellow and Yangtze Rivers, as being notably different from normal specimens of Blyth's vole due to their dark fur and parts of their dental structure, which resembled that of Brandt's vole (Lasiopodomys brandtii). The plateau vole's type locality is given as the upper reaches of the Tongtian River in southern Qinghai, China. The species name, fuscus, is Latin for "dark".

The taxonomy of the plateau vole has varied over the years. American naturalist Gerrit Smith Miller Jr. wrote briefly on the plateau vole in 1896, describing it as a species belonging to the subgenus Phaiomys; It was only clarified as a distinct species, Lasiopodomys fuscus, in 1980 by the work of Zheng Changlin and Wang Song. Prior to 1980, it was also variously placed in the subgenera Pitymys and Microtus. Authors following them agreed with this placement up until 2012, when it was clarified as a member of the genus Neodon by analysis of cytochrome b nucleotide sequences.

The plateau vole has no known subspecies. Some common names for the plateau vole include the Smoky Mountain vole, Qinghai vole, and smokey vole. It is closely related to Blyth's vole, the Linzhi mountain vole (Neodon linzhiensis), Forrest's mountain vole (Neodon forresti), and Chinese scrub vole (Neodon irene):

Cladogram showing genetic relationships between some members of Neodon, based on work by Wang et al., 2024 and Liu et al., 2022

- - - Neodon fuscus
    - - Neodon linzhiensis
      - - Neodon forresti
        - Neodon irene
  - Neodon leucurus
- Other members of Neodon

== Description ==
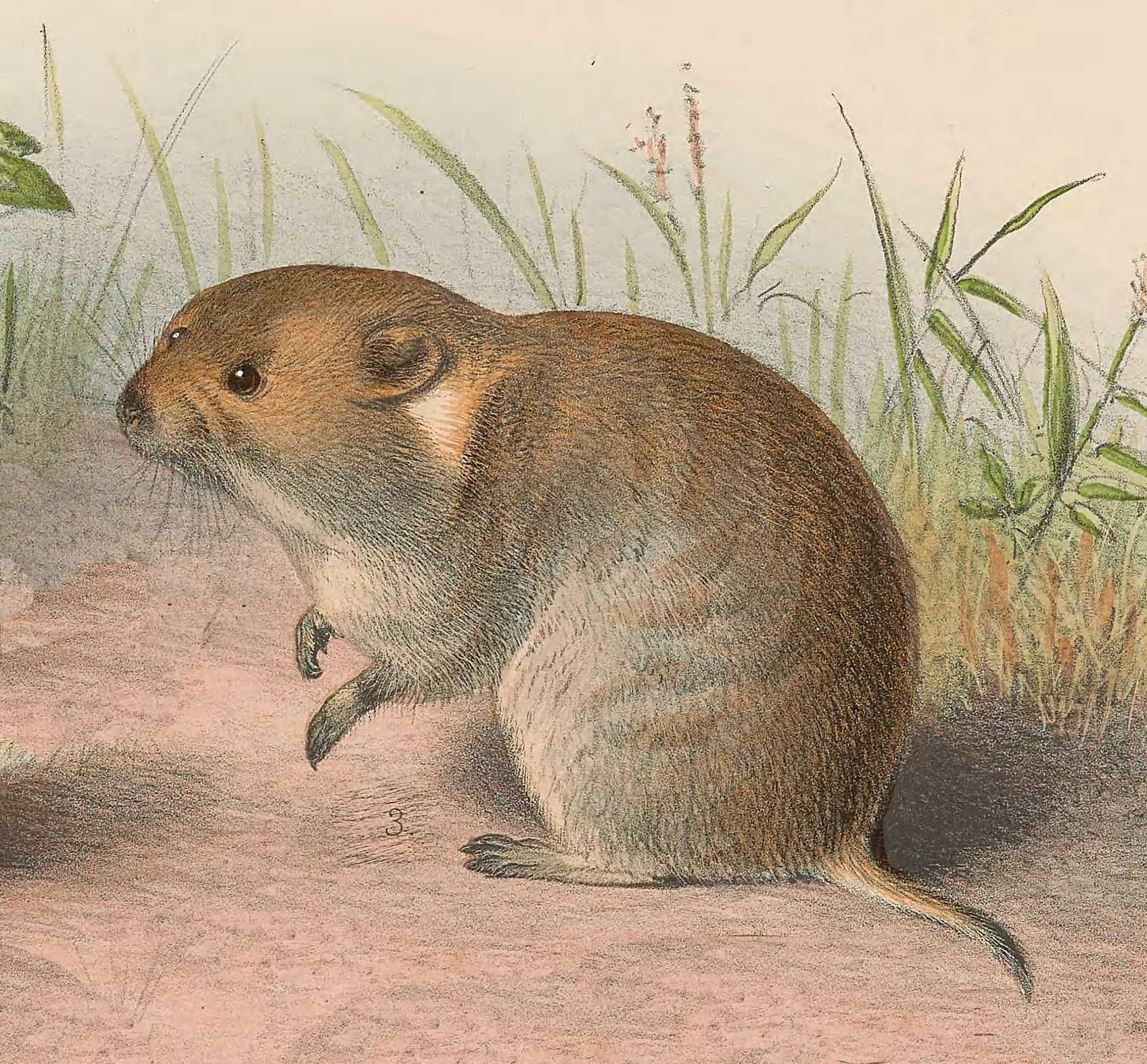
19th-century illustration of the plateau vole by Gustav Mützel

Adult plateau voles have a head-body length of 9.5 to 15 centimetres (3.7 to 5.9 inches) and a tail length of 2 to 4 cm (0.8 to 1.6 in). They typically weigh from 30 to 81 grams (1.1 to 2.9 ounces). Their hind feet measure at 1.7 to 2.4 cm (0.7 to 0.9 in), and their ears are 1 to 2 cm (0.4 to 0.8 in) long. The head and back of the vole's body is covered in grayish brown fur. Its sides are more gray to yellowish brown; the tail is more brown above and yellow below. The feet have gray to buff-coloured upper surfaces.

== Habitat and distribution ==
The plateau vole occurs in China in the south of Qinghai province. It is largely found on the Tibetan Plateau, where it is sympatric with Blyth's vole. These voles are the most widely distributed members of the genus Neodon. The plateau vole is found at elevations between 3,700 and 4,800 metres (12,100 and 15,700 feet), where it inhabits grassy, moist meadows. It has been found in regions of northern Qinghai that are grazed by yaks and camels. Other preferred habitats of the plateau vole include alpine semi-desert steppes and grasslands flush with sedges in the genus Carex.

== Ecology and behaviour ==
Plateau voles live in large colonies. They are herbivorous.

The species' mitochondrial genome has been sequenced, which has provided insight into how the species adapted to its high-altitude habitat. Members of the genus Neodon are more cold-tolerant and have improved sperm quality compared to rodents not acclimated to high-altitude environments. The plateau vole in particular can handle hypoxic conditions by switching to metabolism of glucose rather than fatty acids. This behaviour has also been observed in some Andean mice, particularly the Andean leaf-eared mouse and yellow-rumped leaf-eared mouse. The plateau vole also increases its volume of hemoglobin to improve oxygen transport in efforts to combat hypoxia, and in turn reduces its regulation of genes that encode fibrinogen and interact with albumin to avoid complications of having more viscous blood; this is potentially disadvantageous to the vole's ability to repair wounds and induce immune responses.

Several parasites affect the plateau vole. One such parasite is the tapeworm Hydatigera kamiyai, which infects cats as well. The widespread nematode Mastophorus muris is another known parasite of the plateau vole. The nematode's eggs enter the rodent's body through the mouth, and the larvae develop in the mesentery before emerging into the adult form, which lives in the stomach. Plateau voles are also a potential vector for the spread of the protozoan parasite Toxoplasma gondii. Several previously unknown bacteria belonging to the genus Microbacterium were discovered in the vole's intestines in 2026.

== Conservation status ==
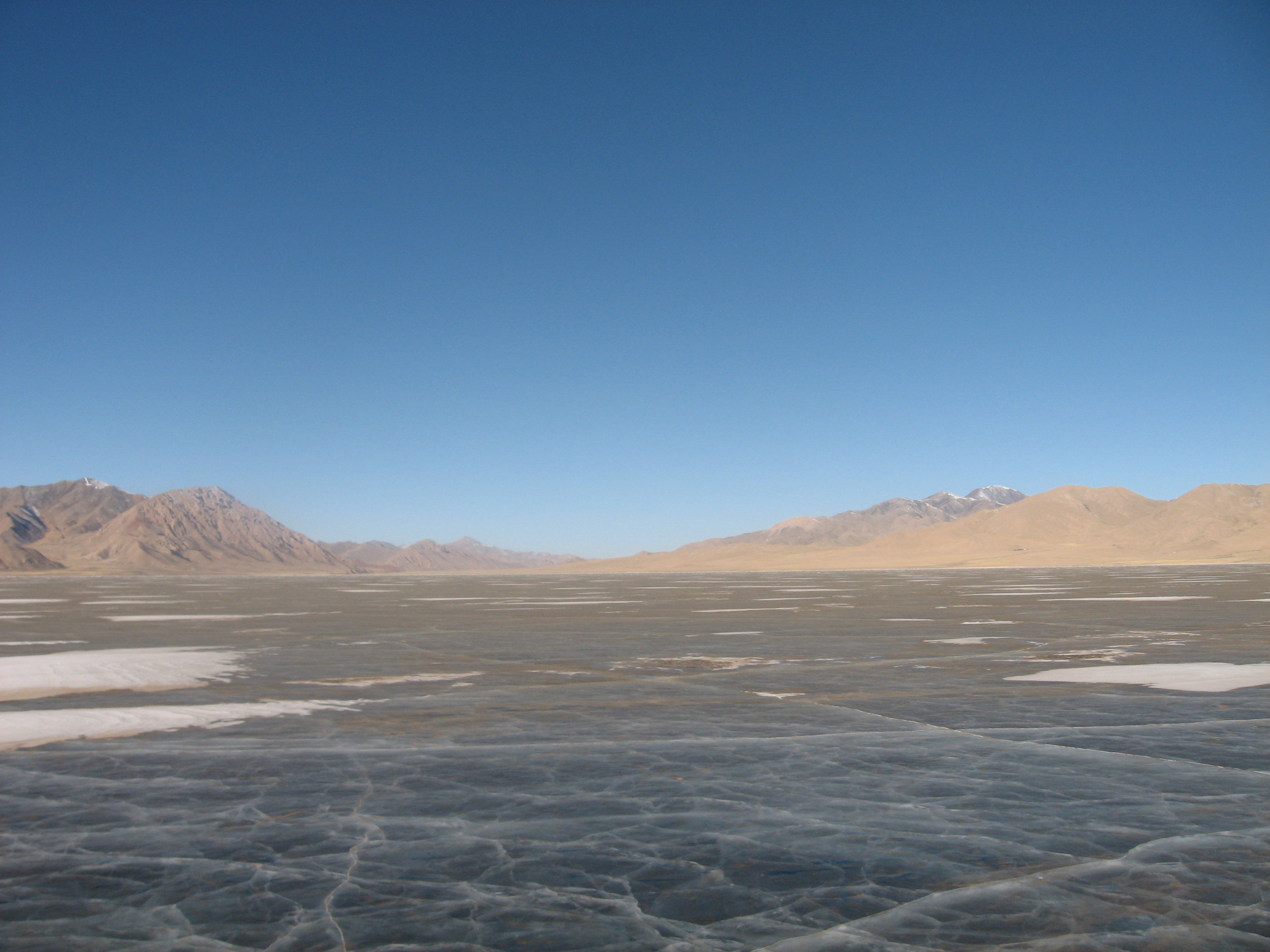
Lake Donggi Cona in the northeastern Tibetan Plateau, a region inhabited by the plateau vole

Little is known about potential threats to the plateau vole species. Poisoning of small mammals, including voles, is known to occur throughout the Tibetan Plateau, but the plateau vole has not been surveyed frequently enough to measure the extent of potential population declines. An initial survey of the species in 2012 found that its population density ranges from 137 to 210 individuals per hectare. It is present in at least one protected area, that being Sanjiangyuan National Park. The International Union for Conservation of Nature considers it a least-concern species, and this same designation is given by the China Species Red List. Plateau voles are considered to be a pest in grassland regions where they are abundant.
