= Zempoaltépec vole =

Conservation status
- Endangered (IUCN 3.1)

Scientific classification
- Kingdom: Animalia
- Phylum: Chordata
- Class: Mammalia
- Infraclass: Placentalia
- Order: Rodentia
- Family: Cricetidae
- Subfamily: Arvicolinae
- Genus: Microtus
- Subgenus: Mynomes
- Species: M. umbrosus

Binomial name
- Microtus umbrosus Merriam, 1898

Species of rodent

The Zempoaltépec vole (Microtus umbrosus) is a species of rodent in the family Cricetidae. The name Microtus is from the Greek word mikros meaning small and otus meaning ear. The name umbrosus could be from the Latin umbros meaning shady. It is rather large and has a long tail when compared with other voles. Its pelage is long and soft. In the upper parts, the hair is uniformly dusky with brown tips and the lower parts a dark grey thinly washed with a reddish yellow color. It is found only in Mexico, in a semi-isolated mountain range southeast of the Cajones River in Mixes district, in Oaxaca.

== Distribution ==
Microtus umbrosus is limited to a semi-isolated mountain range southeast of the Cajones River in the Mixes district of Oaxaca, Mexico. The species has been recorded in an altitude ranging from 1,829 meters in the town of Totontepec to 2,499-3,000 meters on Mount Zempoaltépec at the southern end of the mountain range.

=== Ecology ===
The habitat of this species can be described as humid Upper Astral Zone, dense oak forest, montane pine-oak forest, evergreen cloud-forest, and evergreen broadleaf rainforest. It has been reported from the humid Upper Tropic Subzone. It lives in borrows and long tunnels in moderately moist, well-drained soil.

== Anatomy ==
=== General ===
There exists many anatomical features unique to the Zempoaltépec vole in characterizing the species. This species is larger, has a much longer tail, and large hind feet compared with its other Mexican vole counterparts. Its tail is roughly 33% of its total body length, longer than most other species from the same genus. The feet are large with five plantar tubercles and a basic sixth tubercle. The presence of two pairs mammary glands in the groin area and the absence of mammary glands in the pectoral area is a key feature for this species.

=== Dental Characteristics ===
Total dentition of this species is 4 incisors, no canines or premolars, and 12 molars totaling 16 teeth. On the last mandibular molar there is the presence of two transverse loops and at least one closed median triangle rather than none. The closed median triangle can be found in other North American Microtus species such as M. oaxacensis and M. guatamalensis. The Zempoaltépec vole can be further distinguished by two triangles on the last maxillary molar rather than five that exist in M. oaxacensis or three in M. guatamalensis. The first mandibular molar has an anterior cap merging with two open triangles, three closed triangles, and a posterior lobe.

=== Cranial Features ===
The skull is long and narrow with a long braincase. The intraorbital region is broad; zygomatic arches are slender and not widely spreading; incisive foramina are relatively short and widest in the middle; the palate is low with slender or incomplete lateral pits, and posterior median ridge sloping and grooved; the interpterygoid fossa is wide and quadrate.

== Genetics ==
The diploid chromosome number of M. umbrosus is 56 and the fundamental number is 60. Along with the species M. quasiater, they present the highest diploid chromosomal complement of the Mexican vole species. The karyotype consists of three pairs of small to medium-sized metacentric chromosomes and 24 pairs of telocentric chromosomes. The X chromosome is a large metacentric chromosome and the Y a small telocentric. The Y chromosome of M. umbrosus, M. quasiater, M. mexicanus, and M. oaxacensis all display the same centrometric positioning.

=== Evolution ===
The diploid chromosome number in M. umbrosus matches that of the hypothetical ancestral karyotype of Arvocolinae. The karyotype of M. umbrosus has features similar to the hypothesized primitive pattern for the genus Microtus (Arvocolinae) and may prove that this species is older than its counterpart M. mexicanus. The patterns displayed by the karyotypes of M. umbrosus and M. quasiater are closer to the hypothetical ancestor than other members of the Microtus family.

Anatomical methods have been used to general taxa and phylogenies of the relatives and ancestors of M. umbrosus. Comparing dental morphologies using electron scanning on enamel occlusal surfaces, and tooth measurements have been used to construct cladograms for the Microtus family.

M. umbrosus is not closely related to any extant North American Microtus species. The species has been considered an ancient relict North American survivor of the subgenus Phaiomys from an early invasion from Asia. It may be included in the formerly extinct genus Neodon.

== Conservation ==
The Zempoaltépec vole is considered an endangered and fragile species. This is due to its very restricted geographic range and habitat modification in the state of Oaxaca. Unfortunately, the species lives in an unprotected area. In order to improve conservation efforts in Mexico, additional reserves including the area of M. umbrosus, should be added to additional reserves. Priority for this particular area should be considered as it is home to eight other species of interest.
