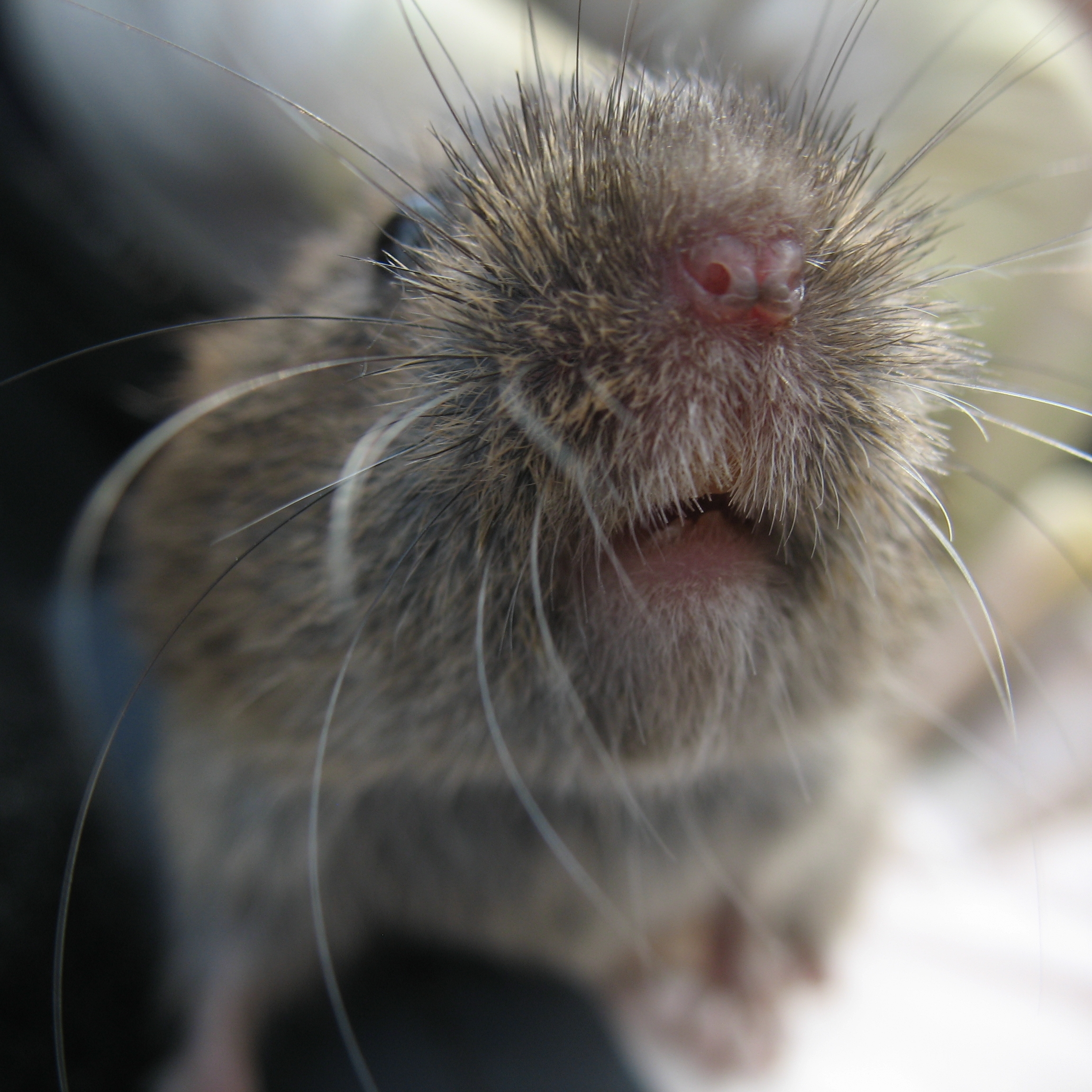

Conservation status
- Least Concern (IUCN 3.1)

Scientific classification
- Kingdom: Animalia
- Phylum: Chordata
- Class: Mammalia
- Order: Rodentia
- Family: Cricetidae
- Subfamily: Arvicolinae
- Genus: Microtus
- Subgenus: Euarvicola
- Species: M. agrestis

Binomial name
- Microtus agrestis (Linnaeus, 1761)
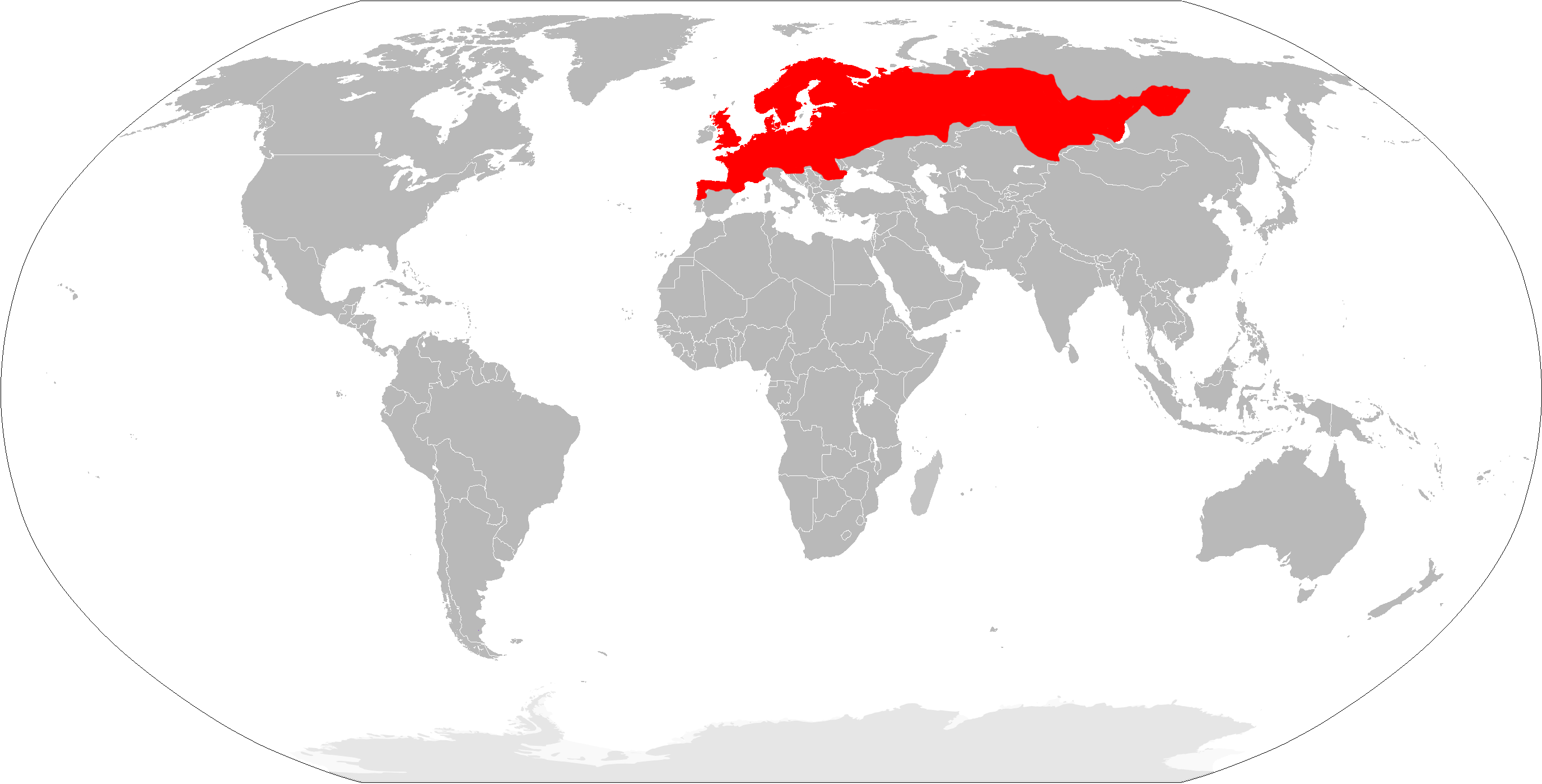
- Field vole distribution

Synonyms
- Mus agrestis Linnaeus, 1761

= Short-tailed field vole =

Species of rodent

The short-tailed field vole, short-tailed vole, or simply field vole (Microtus agrestis), is a grey-brown vole, around 10 cm in length, with a short tail. It is one of the most common mammals in Europe, with a range extending from the Atlantic coast to Lake Baikal. These voles are found in moist grassy habitats, such as woodland, marsh or on river banks. Although they make shallow burrows, they usually build nests above ground. They are an important food source for owls and some other predators and their population size tends to peak and trough cyclically. Field voles breed prolifically, mainly in summer, but often all year round, even under snow. Females produce up to seven litters a year, each averaging from four to six young which are weaned after about fourteen days. The short-tailed field vole is both widespread and common and is listed as being of "Least Concern" by the IUCN.

== Description ==
The short-tailed field vole is a small, dark brown rodent with a short tail, distinguishable from the closely related common vole (Microtus arvalis) by its darker, longer and shaggier hair and by its more densely haired ears. The head and body length varies between 8 and 13 centimetres (3.1 and 5.1 in) and the tail between 3 and 4 centimetres (1.2 and 1.6 in). The weight is 20 to 50 grams (0.71 to 1.76 oz). The voice is a faint, low squeak and it also emits a range of chattering sounds.

== Distribution and habitat ==
The short-tailed field vole has a palearctic distribution. Its range extends throughout Western Europe and eastwards to Lake Baikal in Siberia and north west China and northward to Norway, Sweden and Finland. It is absent from Iceland and thins out southwards towards the Mediterranean Sea. Previously absent, it was detected in Ireland in 2022. It is found in a range of habitats including meadows, field borders, plantations, woodland verges, clearings, upland heaths, dunes, marshes, bogs and river banks and tends to prefer wet areas. It is found at altitudes of up to about 1,700 metres (5,600 ft).

== Behaviour ==
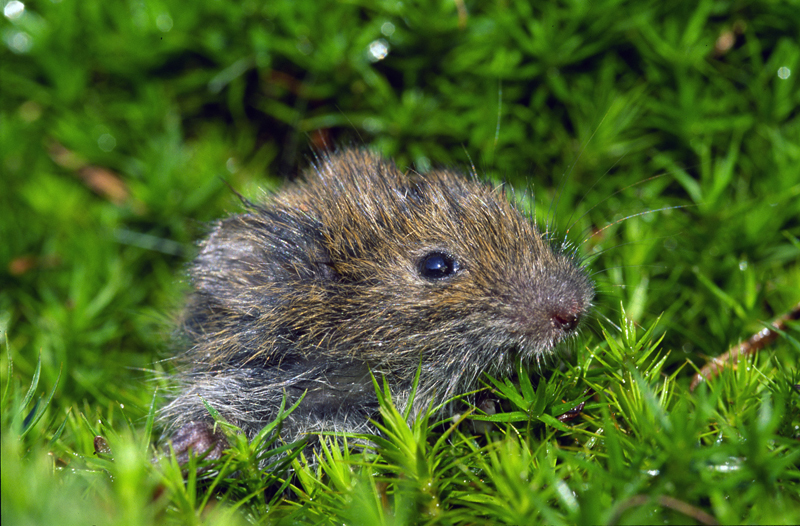
Young short-tailed field vole

The short-tailed field vole is more active by day than the common vole. It excavates shallow burrows close to the surface of the ground, under leaf litter and under snow in winter. It also makes surface runs through tall vegetation, routes along which it can scurry back to safety if danger threatens. Off these are dedicated defecation sites and it often leaves little piles of chopped up grass stalks nearby.

The short-tailed field vole is a herbivore and feeds on grasses, herbs, root tubers, moss and other vegetation and gnaws bark during the winter (it does not hibernate). It occasionally eats invertebrates such as insect larvae. Among the plants it favours are the grasses Agrostis spp. and Festuca rubra, the yarrow (Achillea millefolium), clover (Trifolium spp.), dandelion (Taraxacum officinale) and buttercups (Ranunculus spp.). The voles choose species with high digestibility where possible and avoid some common plants amongst which they live such as the tufted hairgrass (Deschampsia cespitosa) and rosebay willowherb (Chamerion angustifolium). The animals have low energy reserves and these are only able to sustain them for five to fourteen hours. Because of the low availability of food in the winter, drier habitats are unable to sustain populations of much over two hundred animals per hectare. The number of voles expands rapidly with the arrival of spring and the better availability of food supplies.

Field voles are an important part of the diet of barn owls and they are also preyed on by kestrels, other owls, weasels, stoats, foxes and snakes. Though very numerous, they have little impact on man except in plague years when they may cause significant damage to crops.

== Breeding ==
Field voles are induced ovulators. The short-tailed field vole breeds throughout the year but the breeding season peaks in spring and summer. The nest is made on or just under the surface of the ground, often in a clump of grass or sedge. The gestation period is about three weeks and up to a dozen young are borne. These grow rapidly, suckle for twelve days and leave the nest at twenty one days, reaching sexual maturity soon afterwards. Like the common vole, the short-tailed field vole is subject to population explosions when conditions are right. Females become pregnant again soon after parturition. The pregnancy rate is nearly 100% in late spring but falls during midsummer only to rise again later. Mortality in the nest is about 20% but may rise to 50% in the middle of summer when the digestibility of the food supplies fall. Life expectancy is about two years but is lower for spring-born individuals than for ones born later in the year.

Male field voles maintain a territory but females just have a home range which may overlap with that of a neighbour. After leaving the nest, young female voles remain in or near their mother's home range but young males are forced to disperse by the aggressiveness of the adult males. Female field voles sometimes spontaneously move in the time gap between weaning one litter and producing the next, a phenomenon typical of this species. One of the causes of the large population swings that occur in the short-tailed field vole is the scramble competition which comes into play when the most desirable food plants are less available in mid summer. At this time litter sizes may fall, growth rates slow down, there may be increased mortality of young in the nest, adults may lose weight and some may die. Similar competition can occur in winter when the availability of greenstuff fails and starvation ensues.

== Conservation status ==
The short-tailed field vole is common over most of its very wide range, although thinning out towards the peripheries and may be locally scarce where conditions are less suitable. The population seems stable over the long term though there are marked fluctuations from year to year. The IUCN in its Red List of Threatened Species has therefore listed it as being of "Least Concern".
