= Cabrera's vole =

Conservation status
- Near Threatened (IUCN 3.1)

Scientific classification
- Kingdom: Animalia
- Phylum: Chordata
- Class: Mammalia
- Order: Rodentia
- Family: Cricetidae
- Subfamily: Arvicolinae
- Genus: Microtus
- Subgenus: Iberomys; Chaline, 1972
- Species: M. cabrerae

Binomial name
- Microtus cabrerae Thomas, 1906
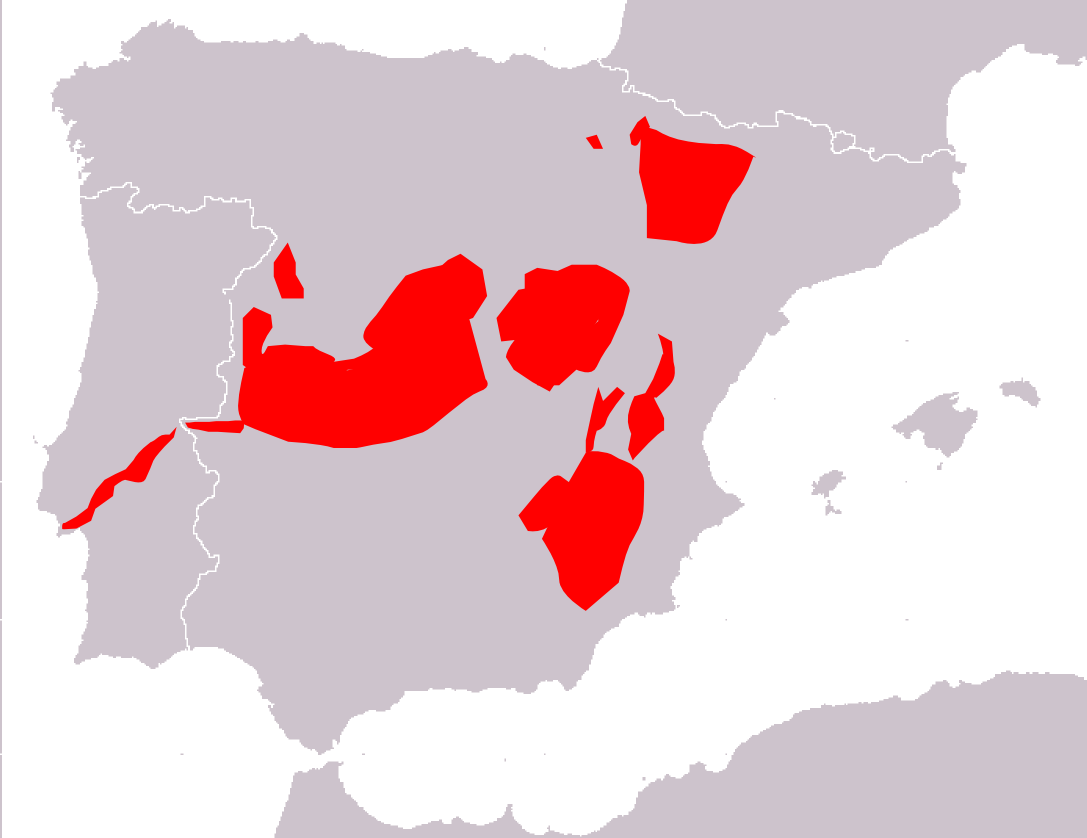
- Approximate distribution of Cabrera's vole

Species of rodent

Cabrera's vole (Microtus cabrerae) is a species of vole native to Spain and Portugal. It is named for Ángel Cabrera, a mammalogist then working at the Museo Nacional de Ciencias Naturales in Madrid. It is the only living member of the subgenus Iberomys, although two fossil species are also known, including M. brecciensis, the likely direct ancestor of the living species.

== Description ==
Cabrera's vole is one of the largest voles in the genus Microtus, with a body length of 10 to 14 cm (3.9 to 5.5 in) and a tail 3 to 5 cm (1.2 to 2.0 in) in length. Adults weigh between 30 and 78 g (1.1 and 2.8 oz), up to five times more than other voles native to Spain and Portugal. They have long, thick fur which is brownish olive over most of the body and yellowish in colour on the underparts. The guard hairs are particularly long, reaching as far as 1 cm (0.39 in) out from the body, greater than that in any other Microtus species. Internally, the caecum is longer than that in most other voles, relative to body size, a feature that may be related to its specialised diet. In other respects, Cabrera's vole is a typical vole, with a rounded head, small ears, and a short tail in comparison to its body.

== Distribution and habitat ==
Cabrera's vole is found only in scattered areas of Spain and Portugal, notably on the southern and western slopes of the mountainous regions of those countries, from the Pyrenees to southern Portugal. Within these regions, the vole inhabits areas of pasture and agricultural land, and clearings in oak forests, and is typically found in small, relatively isolated, populations close to water. The species was much more widespread prior to the late Iron Age about 2000 years ago, and once also inhabited southern France. There are no currently recognised subspecies.

== Biology and behaviour ==
Cabrera's voles live in grassy areas with high soil moisture, often close to streams or ponds, but they rarely remain in a given location for more than four months at a time, and tend to switch to areas with more rushes and sedges in the winter. They are herbivorous, with as much as 58% of their diet consisting of grasses, and are diurnal animals that dig their own burrows.

The voles breed throughout the year, but more commonly in winter than in summer, apparently due to the great availability of green grass. Unusually for voles, they tend to be monogamous, although at least some males do mate with multiple females. Pregnancy lasts for 23 or 24 days, and typically results in the birth of a litter of three to five young. The mother builds a nest five or six days before giving birth.

The young are born hairless and blind, with their ears closed and their toes still fused together. They are initially about 4 mm (0.16 in) long and weigh about 3.5 g (0.12 oz). Their hair is fully grown by five days, they are able to walk by seven or eight days, and their eyes are fully open by day eleven. Shortly after, they begin to explore the nest and to take some solid food; they are fully weaned by 15 days.
