= Namchabarwa mountain vole =

Scientific classification
- Kingdom: Animalia
- Phylum: Chordata
- Class: Mammalia
- Order: Rodentia
- Family: Cricetidae
- Subfamily: Arvicolinae
- Genus: Neodon
- Species: N. namchabarwaensis

Binomial name
- Neodon namchabarwaensis S. Liu, Zhou, Murphy, & Y. Liu, 2022

Species of rodent

The Namchabarwa mountain vole (Neodon namchabarwaensis) is a species of rodent in the family Cricetidae. It is found only in China, and is known from the area south of the Yarlung Zangbo River and north of the Namchabarwa Mountains, after which it is named. The type specimen was found at 3,160 metres (10,370 ft). It was identified from genetic and morphological data in 2022 by Liu et al, along with five other new species of Neodon. The specimens identified as N. namchabarwaensis, collected in 2008, were previously identified as N. skikimensis.

It is a medium-sized mole, with an average adult body length of 114.9 millimetres (4.52 in). The tail is about 40% of the whole body length.

== See also ==
- List of living mammal species described in the 2020s
