= Kerman vole =

Conservation status
- Data Deficient (IUCN 3.1)

Scientific classification
- Kingdom: Animalia
- Phylum: Chordata
- Class: Mammalia
- Order: Rodentia
- Family: Cricetidae
- Subfamily: Arvicolinae
- Genus: Microtus
- Subgenus: Microtus
- Species: M. kermanensis

Binomial name
- Microtus kermanensis Roguin, 1988

Species of rodent

The Kerman vole or Baluchistan vole (Microtus kermanensis) is a species of vole. It is found in Kerman Province, Iran.
