= Stephenson Robert Clarke =

British soldier (1862–1948)

Colonel Stephenson Robert Clarke (1 July 1862 – 3 November 1948) was a British Army officer, naturalist, horticulturist, and landowner. During his army posting in Africa, he collected many bird species, describing several including what is known as Clarke's weaver (Ploceus golandi), named after his brother Captain Goland Clarke.

Clarke was born in Marylebone, London to Agnes Maria Bridger and Stephenson Clarke. He was educated at Winchester and spent some time in France where he learned French interacting with bird-catchers. After finishing school he went on a voyage to New Zealand where he collected his first bird specimens. He joined the Royal Sussex Light Infantry in 1880 and served in South Africa during which time he collected African birds. He commanded the regiment from 1906 to 1912. He was made CB in 1911. He also served in the family business of Stephenson Clarke and Company. He served as a Justice of the Peace for Sussex.

Clarke described the species Lybius chaplini from Northern Rhodesia. In 1923, he gifted his collection of bird specimens to the British Museum. He took a great interest in plants and collected many species on his estate at Borde Hill. He received a Veitch Memorial Gold Medal.

Clarke's vole, Neodon clarkei, is named after him.

Clarke married Edith Gertrude, daughter of Joseph Godman (and niece of Frederick DuCane Godman) in 1890. They had four sons and a daughter, Edith Mary Henrietta, who married C. W. Mackworth-Praed. After the death of Edith Gertrude in 1941, Clarke married Constance Gwendoline.
