= Schidlovsky's vole =

Conservation status
- Least Concern (IUCN 3.1)

Scientific classification
- Kingdom: Animalia
- Phylum: Chordata
- Class: Mammalia
- Order: Rodentia
- Family: Cricetidae
- Subfamily: Arvicolinae
- Genus: Microtus
- Subgenus: Microtus
- Species: M. schidlovskii

Binomial name
- Microtus schidlovskii Argyropulo, 1933

Species of rodent

Schidlovsky's vole (Microtus schidlovskii) is a species of rodent in the family Cricetidae. It is normally found in northwestern Armenia, and was long considered a subspecies of the social vole until relisted as a species by Golenishchev in 2002.
