= Anatolian vole =

Conservation status
- Data Deficient (IUCN 3.1)

Scientific classification
- Kingdom: Animalia
- Phylum: Chordata
- Class: Mammalia
- Order: Rodentia
- Family: Cricetidae
- Subfamily: Arvicolinae
- Genus: Microtus
- Subgenus: Microtus
- Species: M. anatolicus

Binomial name
- Microtus anatolicus Kryštufek & Kefelioğlu, 2002

Species of rodent

The Anatolian vole (Microtus anatolicus) is a species of vole found in Turkey, specifically Konya Province. The population is unknown but it lives in small colonies. The species exists in an area that is a remnant zone of Tethys Ocean, and this area is being increasingly exploited for sugar beet cultivation. Other related threats include irrigation and rodenticides from the sugar beet cultivation. The eastern range may be protected by Lake Tuz Special Protected Area but this area is not well protected and has been deteriorated.
