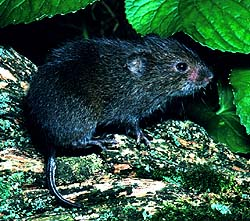
- Meadow vole (Microtus pennsylvanicus)

Scientific classification
- Kingdom: Animalia
- Phylum: Chordata
- Class: Mammalia
- Infraclass: Placentalia
- Order: Rodentia
- Family: Cricetidae
- Subfamily: Arvicolinae; Gray, 1821

Genera
- See text

= Arvicolinae =

Arvicolinae Temporal range: Late Miocene – recent

Subfamily of rodents

The Arvicolinae are a subfamily of rodents that includes the voles, lemmings, and muskrats. They are most closely related to the other subfamilies in the Cricetidae (comprising the hamsters and New World rats and mice). Some authorities place the subfamily Arvicolinae in the family Muridae along with all other members of the superfamily Muroidea. Some refer to the subfamily as the Microtinae (yielding the adjective "microtine") or rank the taxon as a full family, the Arvicolidae.

The Arvicolinae are the most populous group of Rodentia in the Northern Hemisphere. They often are found in fossil occlusions of bones cached by past predators such as owls and other birds of prey. Fossils of this group are often used for biostratigraphic dating of paleontological and archeological sites in North America and Europe.

== Description ==
The most convenient distinguishing feature of the Arvicolinae is the nature of their molar teeth, which have prismatic cusps in the shape of alternating triangles. These molars are an adaptation to a herbivorous diet in which the major food plants include a large proportion of abrasive materials such as phytoliths; the teeth get worn down by abrasion throughout the adult life of the animal and they grow continuously in compensation.

Arvicolinae are Holarctic in distribution and represent one of only a few major muroid radiations to reach the New World via Beringia. (The others are the three subfamilies of New World rats and mice.) Arvicolines do very well in the subnival zone beneath the winter snowpack, and persist throughout winter without needing to hibernate. They are also characterized by extreme fluctuations in population numbers.

Most arvicolines are small, furry, short-tailed voles or lemmings, but some, such as Ellobius and Hyperacrius, are well adapted to a fossorial lifestyle. Others, such as Ondatra, Neofiber, and Arvicola, have evolved larger body sizes and are associated with an aquatic lifestyle.

== Phylogeny ==
The phylogeny of the Arvicolinae has been studied using morphological and molecular characters. Markers for the molecular phylogeny of arvicolines included the mitochondrial DNA cytochrome b (cyb) gene and the exon 10 of the growth hormone receptor (ghr) nuclear gene. The comparison of the cyb and ghr phylogenetic results seems to indicate nuclear genes are useful for resolving relationships of recently evolved animals. As compared to mitochondrial genes, nuclear genes display several informative sites in third codon positions that evolve rapidly enough to accumulate synapomorphies, but slow enough to avoid evolutionary noise. Of note, mitochondrial pseudogenes translocated within the nuclear genome complicate the assessment of the mitochondrial DNA orthology, but they can also be used as phylogenetic markers. Sequencing complete mitochondrial genomes of voles may help to distinguish between authentic genes and pseudogenes.

The complementary phylogenetic analysis of morphological and molecular characters suggests:

- Ellobius, Prometheomys, and Lagurus are among the most basal arvicolines.
- Dicrostonyx, Phenacomys, and Arborimus may form a clade.
- Core arvicolines include four subclades:
  - Lemmini: Synaptomys, Lemmus, Myopus
  - Myodini: Eothenomys, Myodes
  - Arvicolini: Arvicola
  - Microtini: Alexandromys, Chionomys, Hyperacrius, Lasiopodomys, Lemmiscus, Microtus, Mictomicrotus, Neodon, Proedromys, Stenocranius, Volemys
- Ondatra and Dinaromys positions are uncertain, probably compromised by the convergent evolution of morphological characters.

Some authorities have placed the zokors within the Arvicolinae, but they have been shown to be unrelated.

A 2021 study found Lemmini to be the most basal group of Arvicolinae. The study also found Arvicola to actually fall outside the tribe Arvicolini, and to be sister to the tribe Lagurini.

== Classification ==
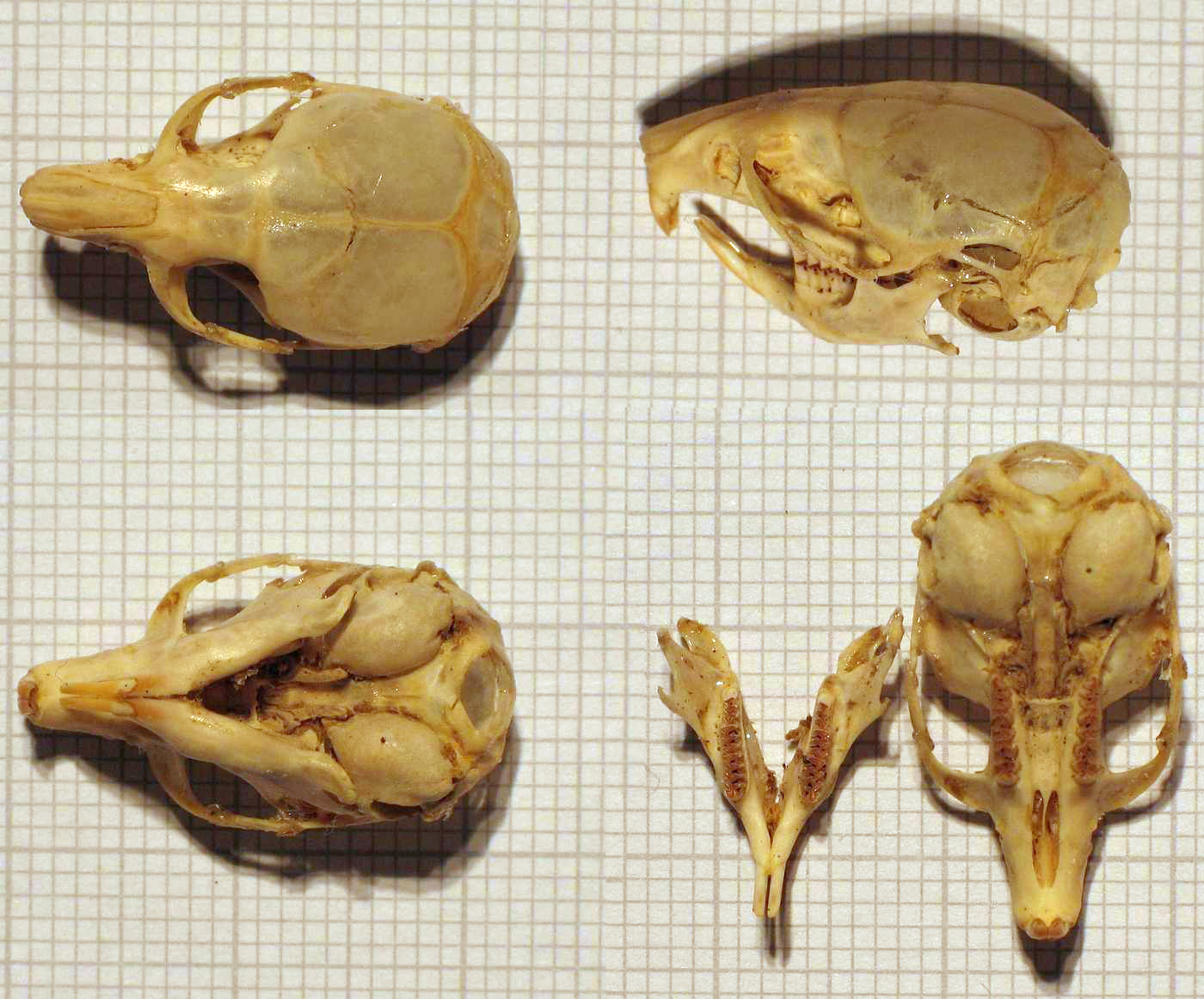
Skull of a bank vole: Note the distinctive molar pattern characteristic of arvicolines.

Subfamily Arvicolinae - voles, lemmings, muskrats

The subfamily Arvicolinae contains eleven tribes, eight of which are classified as voles, two as lemmings, and one as muskrats. Recent changes to the subfamily include disbanding genus Myodes in favor of genera Clethrionomys and Craseomys (and disbanding Myodini in favor of Clethrionomyini), moving most of the genera from Arvicolini to Microtini, and renaming Phenacomyini as Pliophenacomyini.

- Tribe Arvicolini
  - Genus Arvicola - water voles
    - European (or Northern) water vole (Arvicola amphibius or Arvicola terrestris)
    - Southwestern (or southern) water vole (Arvicola sapidus)
    - Montane water vole (Arvicola scherman)
- Tribe Microtini
  - Genus Alexandromys
    - Alpine vole (Alexandromys alpinus) split off from A. mongolicus
    - Evorsk vole (Alexandromys evoronensis)
    - Reed vole (Alexandromys fortis)
    - Taiwan vole (Alexandromys kikuchii)
    - Lacustrine vole (Alexandromys limnophilus)
    - Maximowicz's vole (Alexandromys maximowiczii)
    - Middendorff's vole (Alexandromys middendorffi)
    - Mongolian vole (Alexandromys mongolicus)
    - Japanese grass vole (Alexandromys montebelli)
    - Muya Valley vole (Alexandromys mujanensis)
    - Tundra vole or root vole (Alexandromys oeconomus)
    - Sakhalin vole (Alexandromys sachalinensis)
    - Shantar vole (Alexandromys shantaricus) split off from A. maximowiczii
  - Genus Chionomys - snow voles
    - Caucasian snow vole, Chionomys gud
    - European snow vole, Chionomys nivalis
    - Robert's snow vole, Chionomys roberti
    - Lazistan snow vole (Chionomys lasistanius) split from C. gud
    - Stekolnikov's snow vole (Chionomys stekolnikovi) recently described
  - Genus Hyperacrius - voles from Pakistan
    - True's vole, Hyperacrius fertilis
    - Murree vole, Hyperacrius wynnei
  - Genus Lasiopodomys
    - Brandt's vole, Lasiopodomys brandtii
    - Mandarin vole, Lasiopodomys mandarinus
  - Genus Lemmiscus
    - Sagebrush vole, Lemmiscus curtatus
  - Genus Microtus - voles
    - Insular vole, M. abbreviatus
    - California vole, M. californicus
    - Rock vole, M. chrotorrhinus
    - Long-tailed vole, M. longicaudus
    - Mexican vole, M. mexicanus
    - Singing vole, M. miurus
    - North American water vole, M. richardsoni
    - Zempoaltépec vole, M. umbrosus
    - Taiga vole, M. xanthognathus
    - Subgenus Microtus
      - Field vole, M. agrestis
      - Anatolian vole, M. anatolicus
      - Common vole, M. arvalis
      - Cabrera's vole, M. cabrerae
      - Doğramaci's vole, M. dogramacii
      - Elbeyli vole, M. elbeyli
      - Günther's vole, M. guentheri
      - Harting's vole, M. hartingii
      - Tien Shan vole, M. ilaeus
      - Persian vole, M. irani
      - Mediterranean field vole, M. lavernedii
      - Turkish vole, M. lydius
      - Kerman vole, M. kermanensis
      - Southern vole, M. levis
      - Paradox vole, M. paradoxus
      - Qazvin vole, M. qazvinensis
      - Portuguese field vole, M. rosianus
      - Schidlovsky's vole, M. schidlovskii
      - Social vole, M. socialis
      - European pine vole, M. subterraneus
      - Transcaspian vole, M. transcaspicus
    - Subgenus Blanfordimys
      - Afghan vole, M. afghanus
      - Bucharian vole, M. bucharicus
      - Juniper vole, M. juldaschi
    - Subgenus Terricola
      - Bavarian pine vole, M. bavaricus
      - Calabria pine vole, M. brachycercus
      - Daghestan pine vole, M. daghestanicus
      - Mediterranean pine vole, M. duodecimcostatus
      - Felten's vole, M. felteni
      - Liechtenstein's pine vole, M. liechtensteini
      - Lusitanian pine vole, M. lusitanicus
      - Major's pine vole, M. majori
      - Alpine pine vole, M. multiplex
      - Sicilian pine vole, M. nebrodensis
      - Savi's pine vole, M. savii
      - Tatra pine vole, M. tatricus
      - Thomas's pine vole, M. thomasi
    - Subgenus Mynomes
      - Gray-tailed vole, M. canicaudus
      - Western meadow vole, M. drummondi
      - Florida salt marsh vole, M. dukecampbelli
      - Montane vole, M. montanus
      - Creeping vole, M. oregoni
      - Eastern meadow vole, M. pennsylvanicus
      - Townsend's vole, M. townsendii
    - Subgenus Pitymys
      - Guatemalan vole, M. guatemalensis
      - Tarabundí vole, M. oaxacensis
      - Woodland vole, M. pinetorum
      - Jalapan pine vole, M. quasiater
    - Subgenus Pedomys
      - Prairie vole, M. ochrogaster
    - Subgenus Hyrcanicola
      - Schelkovnikov's pine vole, M. schelkovnikovi
  - Genus Mictomicrotus
    - Liangshan vole, Mictomicrotus liangshanensis
  - Genus Neodon - mountain voles
    - Bershula mountain vole (Neodon bershulaensis)
    - Bomi mountain vole (Neodon bomiensis)
    - Chayu mountain vole (Neodon chayuensis)
    - Clarke's vole (Neodon clarkei)
    - Forrest's mountain vole (Neodon forresti)
    - Plateau vole (Neodon fuscus)
    - Chinese scrub vole (Neodon irene)
    - Blyth's vole (Neodon leucurus)
    - Liao Rui's mountain vole (Neodon liaoruii)
    - Linzhi mountain vole (Neodon linzhiensis)
    - Medog mountain vole (Neodon medogensis)
    - Namchabarwa mountain vole (Neodon namchabarwaensis)
    - Nepalese mountain vole (Neodon nepalensis)
    - Nyalam mountain vole (Neodon nyalamensis)
    - Shergyla mountain vole (Neodon shergylaensis)
    - Sikkim mountain vole (Neodon sikimensis)
  - Genus Proedromys
    - Duke of Bedford's vole (Proedromys bedfordi)
  - Genus Stenocranius
    - Narrow-headed vole (Stenocranius gregalis)
    - Radde's vole (Stenocranius raddei)
  - Genus Volemys
    - Szechuan vole (Volemys millicens)
    - Marie's vole (Volemys musseri)
- Tribe Dicrostonychini - collared lemmings
  - Genus Dicrostonyx
    - Northern collared lemming, D. groenlandicus
    - Nelson's collared lemming, D. nelsoni
    - Ungava collared lemming, D. hudsonius
    - Ogilvie Mountains collared lemming, D. nunatakensis
    - Richardson's collared lemming, D. richardsoni
    - Arctic lemming, D. torquatus
    - Unalaska collared lemming, D. unalascensis
- Tribe Ellobiusini - mole voles
  - Genus Ellobius - mole voles
    - Alai mole vole, E. alaicus
    - Southern mole vole, E. fuscocapillus
    - Transcaucasian mole vole, E. lutescens
    - Northern mole vole, E. talpinus
    - Zaisan mole vole, E. tancrei
- Tribe Lagurini
  - Genus Eolagurus
    - Yellow steppe lemming, E. luteus
    - Przewalski's steppe lemming, E. przewalskii
  - Genus Lagurus
    - Steppe lemming, L. lagurus
- Tribe Lemmini
  - Genus Lemmus - true lemmings
    - Amur lemming, L. amurensis
    - Norway lemming, L. lemmus
    - Beringian lemming, L. nigripes
    - East Siberian lemming, L. paulus
    - West Siberian lemming, L. sibiricus
    - Canadian lemming, L. trimucronatus
  - Genus Myopus
    - Wood lemming, M. schisticolor
  - Genus Synaptomys - bog lemmings
    - Northern bog lemming, S. borealis
    - Southern bog lemming, S. cooperi
- Tribe Clethrionomyini
  - Genus Alticola - voles from Central Asia
    - Subgenus Alticola
      - White-tailed mountain vole, A. albicauda
      - Silver mountain vole, A. argentatus
      - Gobi Altai mountain vole, A. barakshin
      - Central Kashmir vole, A. montosa
      - Royle's mountain vole, A. roylei
      - Mongolian silver vole, A. semicanus
      - Stolička's mountain vole, A. stoliczkanus
      - Tuva silver vole, A. tuvinicus
    - Subgenus Aschizomys
      - Lemming vole, A. lemminus
      - Large-eared vole, A. macrotis
      - Lake Baikal mountain vole, A. olchonensis
    - Subgenus Platycranius
      - Flat-headed vole, A. strelzowi
  - Genus Caryomys
    - Ganzu vole, C. eva
    - Kolan vole, C. inez
  - Genus Eothenomys - voles from East Asia
    - Kachin red-backed vole, E. cachinus
    - Pratt's vole, E. chinensis
    - Southwest China vole, E. custos
    - Père David's vole, E. melanogaster
    - Yunnan red-backed vole, E. miletus
    - Chaotung vole, E. olitor
    - Yulungshan vole, E. proditor
    - Ward's red-backed vole, E. wardi
  - Genus Craseomys - red-backed voles
    - Anderson's red-backed vole, C. andersoni
    - Imaizumi's red-backed vole, C. imaizumii
    - Korean red-backed vole, C. regulus
    - Hokkaido red-backed vole, C. rex
    - Grey red-backed vole, C. rufocanus
    - Shansei vole, C. shanseius
    - Smith's vole, C. smithii
  - Genus Clethrionomys - red-backed voles
    - Western red-backed vole, C. californicus
    - Tien Shan red-backed vole, C. centralis
    - Southern red-backed vole, C. gapperi
    - Bank vole, C. glareolus
    - Northern red-backed vole, C. rutilus
- Tribe Ondatrini - muskrats
  - Genus Neofiber
    - Round-tailed muskrat, N. alleni
  - Genus Ondatra
    - Muskrat, O. zibethicus
- Tribe Pliophenacomyini
  - Genus Arborimus - tree voles
    - White-footed vole, A. albipes
    - Red tree vole, A. longicaudus
    - Sonoma tree vole or California red tree mouse, A. pomo
  - Genus Phenacomys - heather voles
    - Western heather vole, P. intermedius
    - Eastern heather vole, P. ungava
- Tribe Pliomyini
  - Genus Dinaromys
    - Balkan snow vole, D. bogdanovi
- Tribe Prometheomyini
  - Genus Prometheomys
    - Long-clawed mole vole, P. schaposchnikowi

=== Fossil species ===
- Tribe Arvicolini
  - Genus Mimomys †
- Tribe Dicrostonychini - collared lemmings
  - Genus Predicrostonyx †
- Tribe Clethrionomyini
  - Genus Altaiomys †
  - Genus Pitymimomys †
  - Genus Borsodia †
  - Genus Allophaiomys †
  - Genus Prolagurus †
- Tribe Pliomyini
  - Genus Pliomys † (extinct c. 12,000 years ago)

== See also ==
- Hantavirus
- Isla Vista virus
