= Qazvin vole =

Conservation status
- Least Concern (IUCN 3.1)

Scientific classification
- Kingdom: Animalia
- Phylum: Chordata
- Class: Mammalia
- Order: Rodentia
- Family: Cricetidae
- Subfamily: Arvicolinae
- Genus: Microtus
- Subgenus: Microtus
- Species: M. qazvinensis

Binomial name
- Microtus qazvinensis Golenishchev et al., 2003

Species of rodent

The Qazvin vole (Microtus qazvinensis) is a species of rodent in the family Cricetidae. It is found in Iran and is normally given as either part of the Microtus or Sumeriomys subgenus. It is a close relative of M. guentheri distinguished by different pelage coloration and a more complex occlusal pattern.
