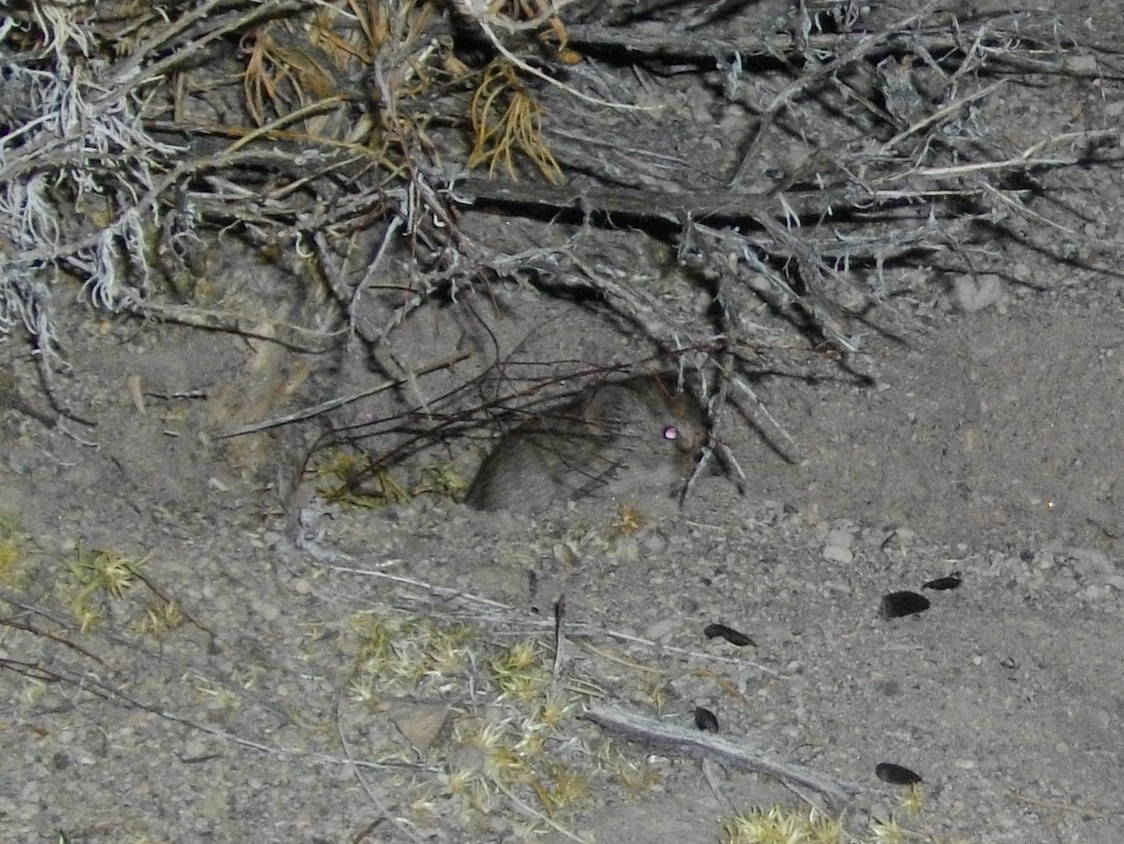

Conservation status
- Least Concern (IUCN 3.1)

Scientific classification
- Kingdom: Animalia
- Phylum: Chordata
- Class: Mammalia
- Order: Rodentia
- Family: Cricetidae
- Subfamily: Arvicolinae
- Tribe: Microtini
- Genus: Lemmiscus; Thomas, 1912
- Species: L. curtatus

Binomial name
- Lemmiscus curtatus (Cope, 1868)

= Sagebrush vole =

Sagebrush vole Temporal range: Middle Pleistocene - Recent

Species of mammal

The sagebrush vole (Lemmiscus curtatus) is a tiny vole found in western North America. It is the only member of the genus Lemmiscus.

They are somewhat similar in appearance to lemmings. They have chunky bodies with short legs and a very short tail which is covered in fur and lighter below. They have fluffy dull grey fur with lighter underparts. They range from 11 to 14 cm in length with a tail length of around 1.8-2.7 cm and a mass of around 21-39 g.

These animals are found in dry open brushy areas in the western United States and southern parts of western Canada. They feed on grasses and leaves in summer and sagebrush, bark and twigs in winter. Predators include owls, coyotes, bobcats and weasels.

Female voles have 5 or more litters of 4 to 6 young in a year. The young are born in a nest in a burrow.

They are active year-round, day and night, but are usually more active near sunrise and sunset. They make trails through the surface vegetation and also dig burrows with many entrances. They burrow under the snow in winter. These animals are often found in colonies.
