= Liangshan vole =

Conservation status
- Data Deficient (IUCN 3.1)

Scientific classification
- Kingdom: Animalia
- Phylum: Chordata
- Class: Mammalia
- Order: Rodentia
- Family: Cricetidae
- Subfamily: Arvicolinae
- Tribe: Microtini
- Genus: Mictomicrotus; Liu, Sun, Zeng & Zhao, 2007
- Species: M. liangshanensis

Binomial name
- Mictomicrotus liangshanensis (Liu, Sun, Zeng & Zhao, 2007)

Synonyms
- Proedromys liangshanensis Liu, Sun, Zeng & Zhao, 2007

Species of mammal

The Liangshan vole (Mictomicrotus liangshanensis) is a species of rodent in the family Cricetidae. It used to be placed in Proedromys, but has been moved to Mictomicrotus, where it is the sole member of its genus. It is found only in mountainous parts of central China.
