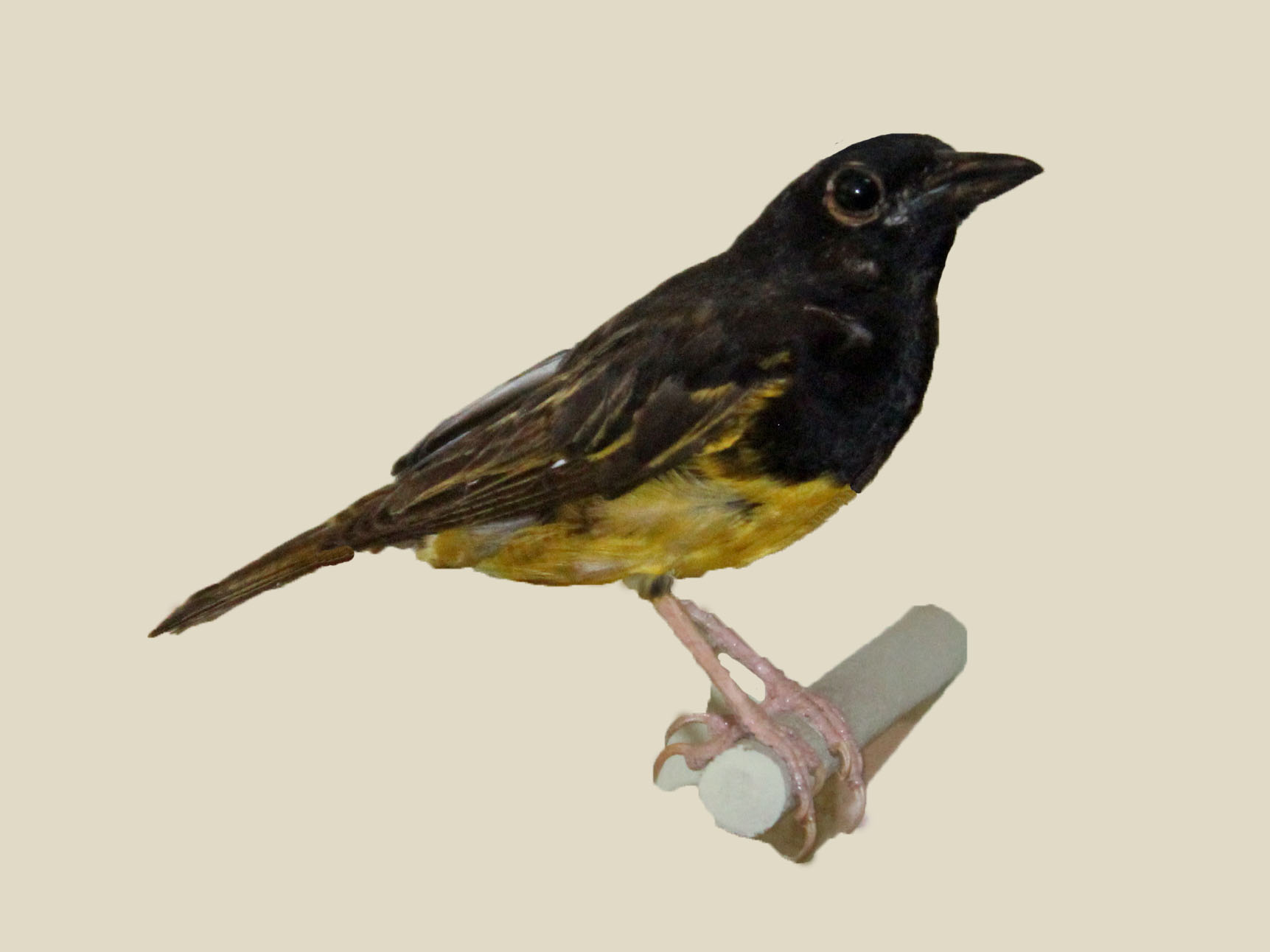
- specimen at Nairobi National Museum
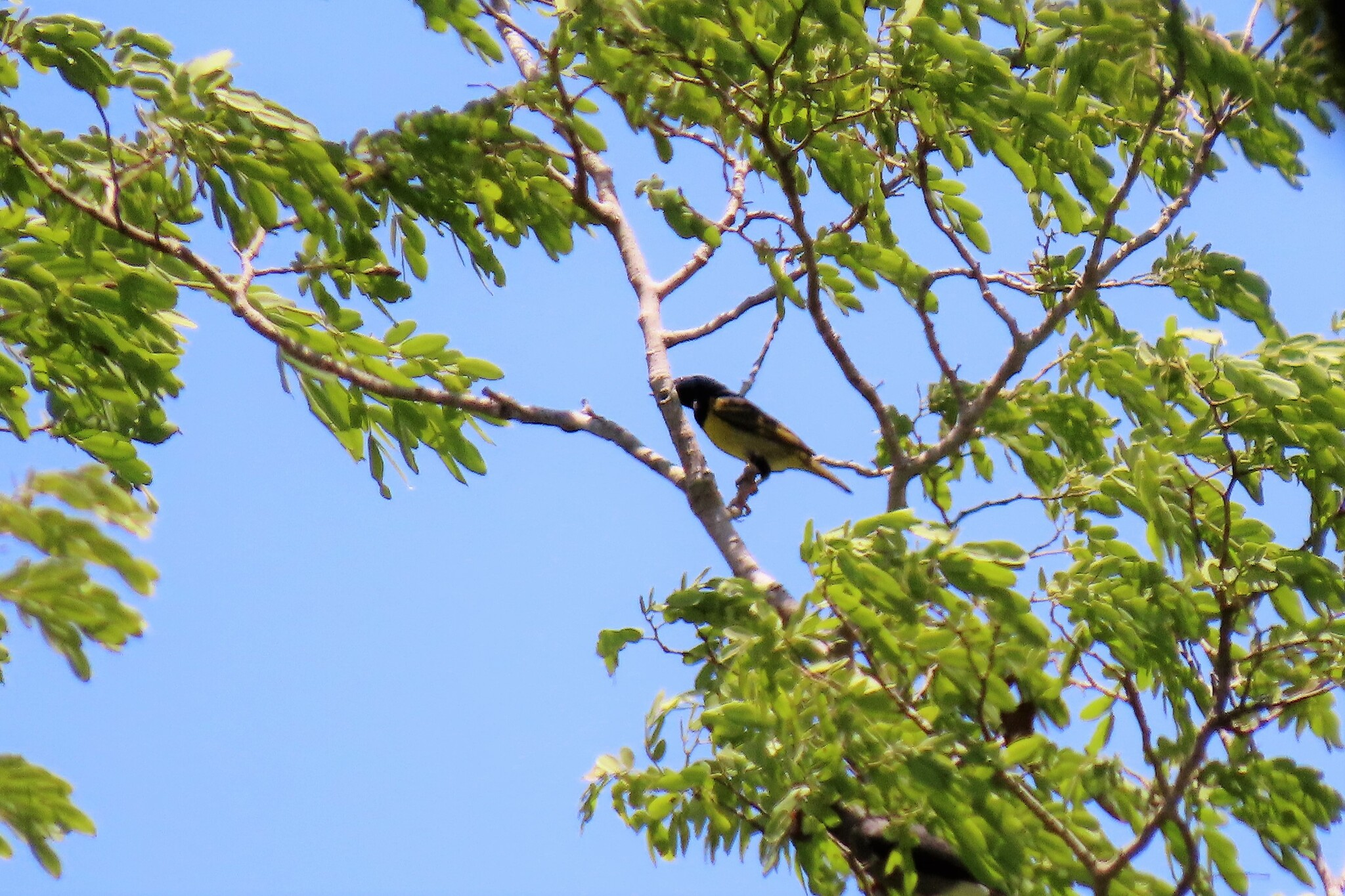

Conservation status
- Endangered (IUCN 3.1)

Scientific classification
- Kingdom: Animalia
- Phylum: Chordata
- Class: Aves
- Order: Passeriformes
- Family: Ploceidae
- Genus: Ploceus
- Species: P. golandi

Binomial name
- Ploceus golandi (Clarke, 1913)

= Kilifi weaver =

Species of bird

The Kilifi weaver (Ploceus golandi), also known as Clarke's weaver, is a species of bird in the family Ploceidae. It is endemic to Kenya.

Its natural habitat is subtropical or tropical moist lowland forests. It is threatened by habitat loss.

The name "Clarke's weaver" is after Captain Goland Clarke, brother of Stephenson Robert Clarke, who described the species.
