= Lazistan snow vole =

Conservation status
- Least Concern (IUCN 3.1)

Scientific classification
- Kingdom: Animalia
- Phylum: Chordata
- Class: Mammalia
- Infraclass: Placentalia
- Order: Rodentia
- Family: Cricetidae
- Subfamily: Arvicolinae
- Genus: Chionomys
- Species: C. lasistanius

Binomial name
- Chionomys lasistanius Neuhäuser, 1936

Species of rodent

Lazistan snow vole (Chionomys lasistanius) is a species of rodent in the family Cricetidae. It was originally treated as a subspecies of Chionomys gud. It is found in Turkey and Georgia.
