= Donggi Cona =

Lake of China

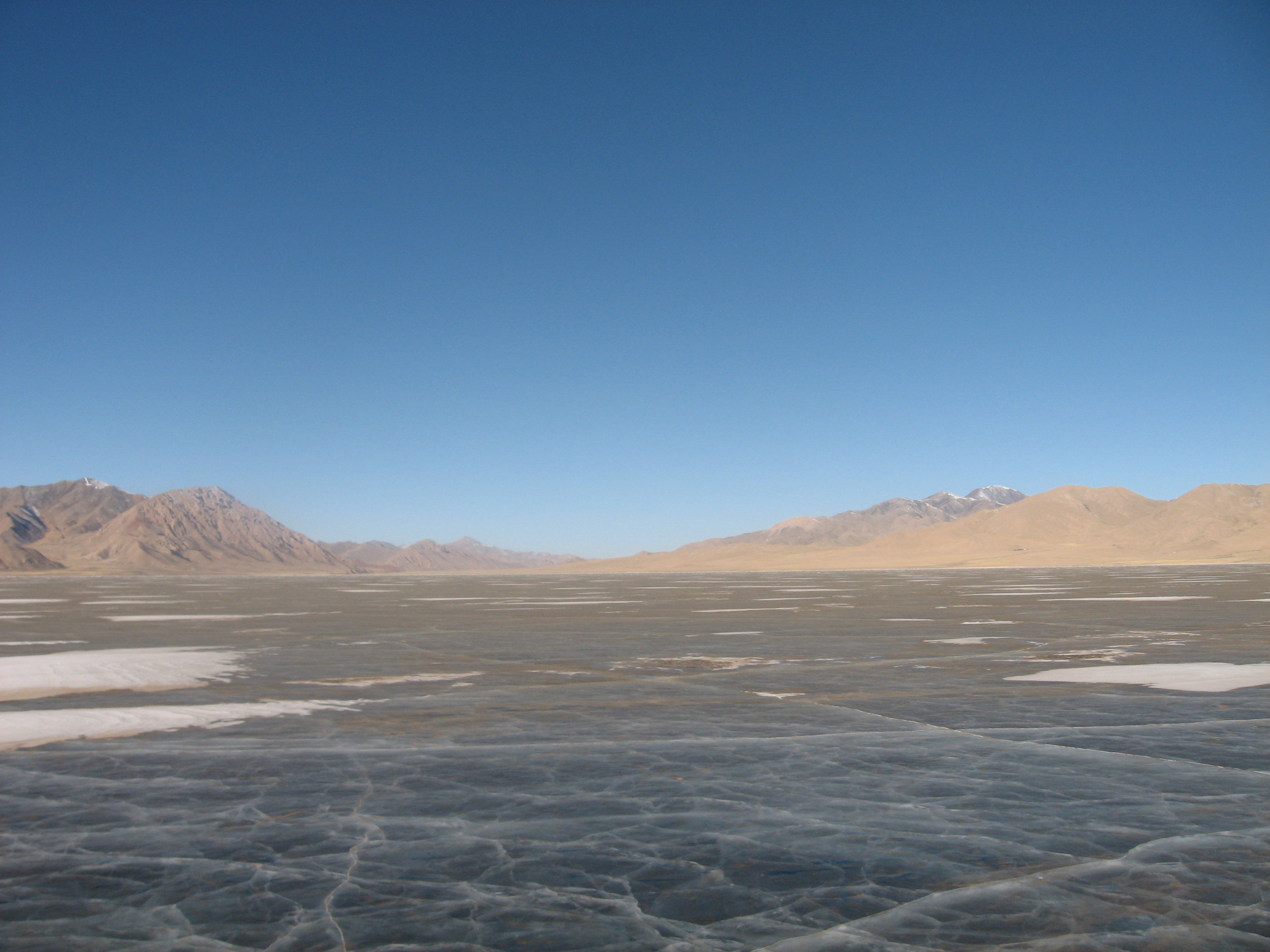
- Lake Donggi Cona with ice cover

- Location within Qinghai
- Location: Qinghai, China
- Coordinates: 35°17′N 98°32′E
- Catchment area: 3,174 km^{2} (1,225 sq mi)
- Basin countries: China
- Surface area: 229 km^{2} (88 sq mi)
- Max. depth: 90 m (300 ft)
- Surface elevation: 4,090 m (13,420 ft)

Lake Donggi Cona (also Donggei Cuona or Dongxi Co) is a freshwater lake located 4090 m above sea level at the northeastern Tibetan Plateau.

== Geology and water chemistry ==
The lake basin is a tectonic pull-apart structure situated at the highly active Kunlun fault. It is characterised by a 92 m deep graben structure in the deeper western part of the lake basin, and a more shallow eastern part which is filled up with fluvial sediments.

During different episodes of the last ice age, the lake level was 24 to 57 m lower than today, and the lake was a closed system without outflow. With rising lake levels during the Holocene, an outflow developed ca. 4300 years ago, turning the lake into an open system.

Since ca. 6800 years, the lake is an oligotrophic freshwater lake, with oxygen supply down to the lake bottom and a mean pH of 8.6. A higher primary productivity than at present and brackish conditions were inferred for the late glacial to mid Holocene period.

== Ecology ==
The vegetation in the lake catchment consists mainly of alpine meadows dominated by Kobresia, Artemisia, and Poaceae. Dunes on the alluvial plains around the lake are characterised by the occurrence of Salix sp.
