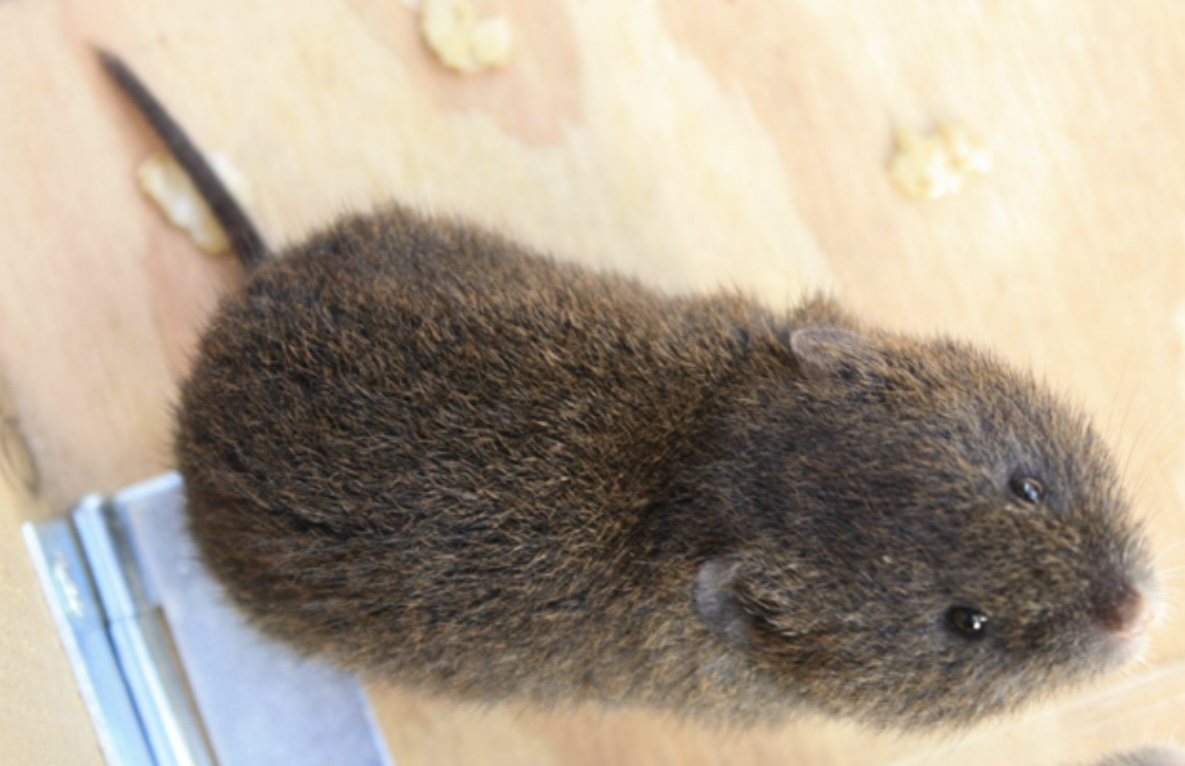

Scientific classification
- Kingdom: Animalia
- Phylum: Chordata
- Class: Mammalia
- Infraclass: Placentalia
- Order: Rodentia
- Family: Cricetidae
- Subfamily: Arvicolinae
- Genus: Neodon
- Species: N. nepalensis

Binomial name
- Neodon nepalensis Pradhan, Sharma, Sherchan, Chhetri, Shrestha, & Kilpatrick, 2019

= Nepalese mountain vole =

Species of rodent

The Nepalese mountain vole (Neodon nepalensis) is a species of rodent in the family Cricetidae. It is found only in Nepal.
