= Doğramaci's vole =

Conservation status
- Least Concern (IUCN 3.1)

Scientific classification
- Kingdom: Animalia
- Phylum: Chordata
- Class: Mammalia
- Order: Rodentia
- Family: Cricetidae
- Subfamily: Arvicolinae
- Genus: Microtus
- Subgenus: Microtus
- Species: M. dogramacii

Binomial name
- Microtus dogramacii Kefelioğlu & Kryštufek, 1999

Species of rodent

Doğramaci's vole (Microtus dogramacii) is a species of rodent in the family Cricetidae. It is found in Turkey, Syria, Jordan, Iran, and probably Iraq and Lebanon. It was previously believed to be native only to central Turkey. It is similar to the social vole, although different in terms of cranial proportions and karyotype.
