= Transcaspian vole =

Conservation status
- Least Concern (IUCN 3.1)

Scientific classification
- Kingdom: Animalia
- Phylum: Chordata
- Class: Mammalia
- Order: Rodentia
- Family: Cricetidae
- Subfamily: Arvicolinae
- Genus: Microtus
- Subgenus: Microtus
- Species: M. transcaspicus

Binomial name
- Microtus transcaspicus Satunin, 1905

Species of rodent

The Transcaspian vole (Microtus transcaspicus) is a species of rodent in the family Cricetidae. It is found in Afghanistan, Iran, and Turkmenistan.

== Notes ==
- Musser, G. G. and M. D. Carleton. 2005. Superfamily Muroidea. pp. 894–1531 in Mammal Species of the World a Taxonomic and Geographic Reference. D. E. Wilson and D. M. Reeder eds. Johns Hopkins University Press, Baltimore.
