= Forrest's mountain vole =

Conservation status
- Data Deficient (IUCN 3.1)

Scientific classification
- Kingdom: Animalia
- Phylum: Chordata
- Class: Mammalia
- Order: Rodentia
- Family: Cricetidae
- Subfamily: Arvicolinae
- Genus: Neodon
- Species: N. forresti

Binomial name
- Neodon forresti Hinton, 1923
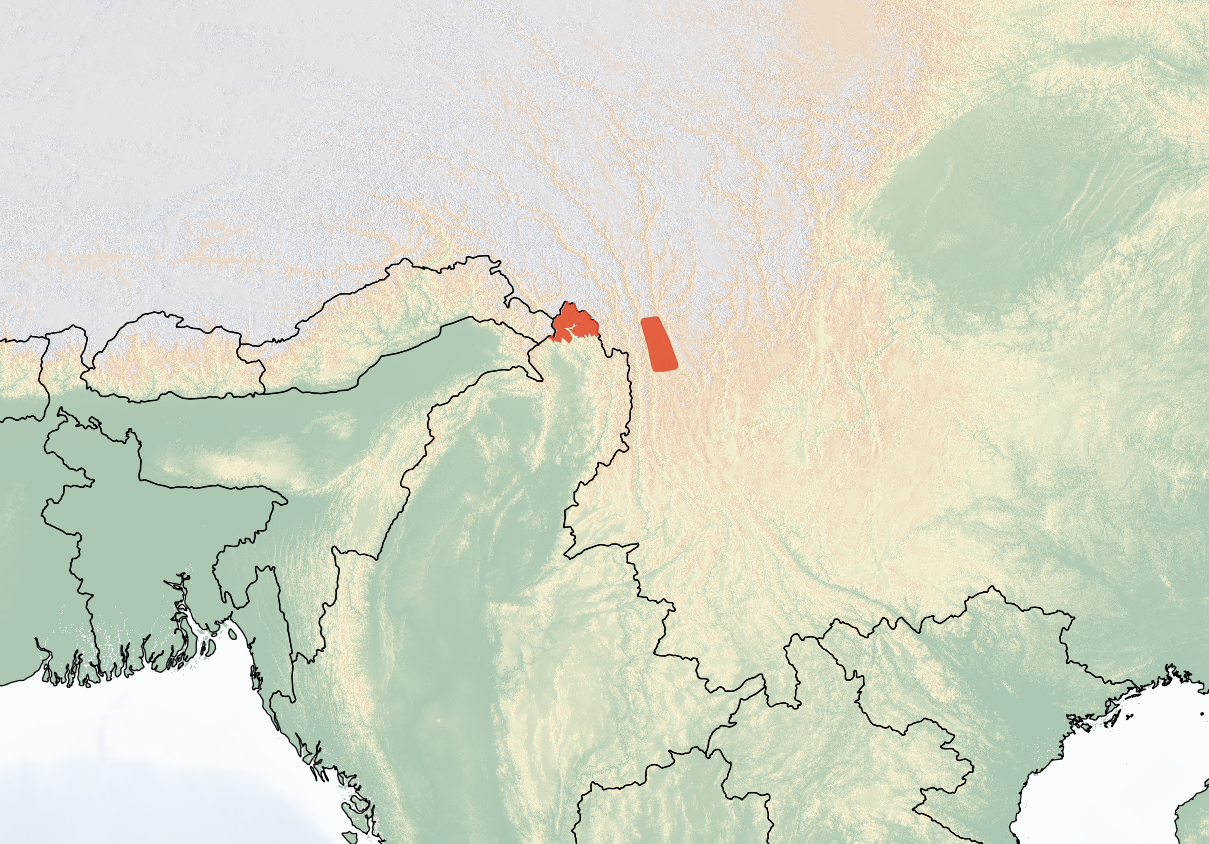

Species of rodent

Forrest's mountain vole (Neodon forresti) is a species of rodent in the family Cricetidae found within China in northwest Yunnan. The initial study by Hinton in 1923 identified it as morphologically close to the Chinese scrub vole (N. irene) but with a larger body size and longer and darker pelage.
