= Clarke's vole =

Conservation status
- Least Concern (IUCN 3.1)

Scientific classification
- Kingdom: Animalia
- Phylum: Chordata
- Class: Mammalia
- Order: Rodentia
- Family: Cricetidae
- Subfamily: Arvicolinae
- Genus: Neodon
- Species: N. clarkei

Binomial name
- Neodon clarkei (Hinton, 1923)
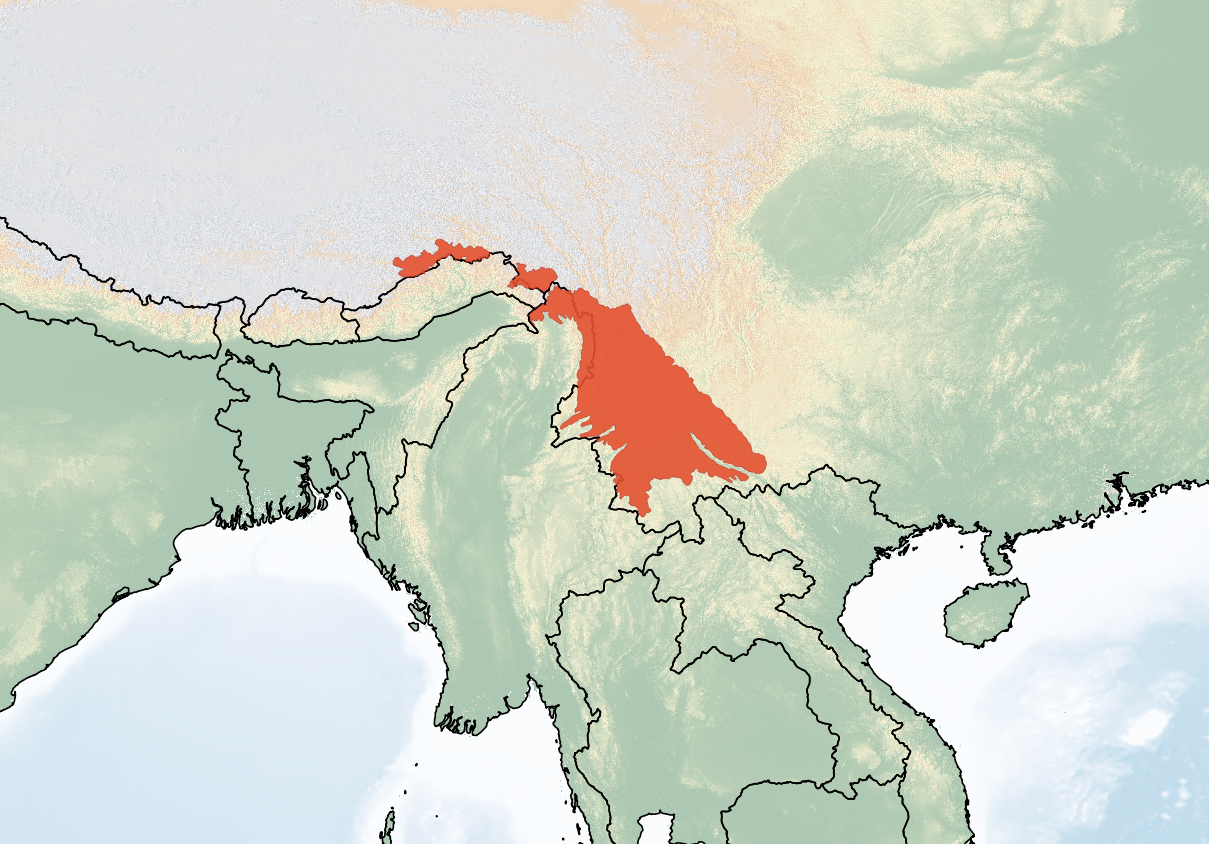

Synonyms
- Microtus clarkei Hinton, 1923; Volemys clarkei (Hinton, 1923)

Species of rodent

Clarke's vole (Neodon clarkei) is a species of rodent in the family Cricetidae. It is found only in China. It is named after Colonel Stephenson Robert Clarke.
