= Paradox vole =

Conservation status
- Least Concern (IUCN 3.1)

Scientific classification
- Kingdom: Animalia
- Phylum: Chordata
- Class: Mammalia
- Infraclass: Placentalia
- Order: Rodentia
- Family: Cricetidae
- Subfamily: Arvicolinae
- Genus: Microtus
- Subgenus: Microtus
- Species: M. paradoxus

Binomial name
- Microtus paradoxus (Ognev & Heptner, 1928)

Synonyms
- Chilotus paradoxurus Ognev & Heptner, 1928

Species of rodent

The paradox vole (Microtus paradoxus), also called the Kopet Dag pine vole or Khorasan social vole, is a species of rodent in the family Cricetidae found in southern Turkmenistan and northeastern Iran. It is endemic to the Kopet Dag mountain range.
