= Duke of Bedford's vole =

Conservation status
- Vulnerable (IUCN 3.1)

Scientific classification
- Kingdom: Animalia
- Phylum: Chordata
- Class: Mammalia
- Order: Rodentia
- Family: Cricetidae
- Subfamily: Arvicolinae
- Tribe: Microtini
- Genus: Proedromys; Thomas, 1911
- Species: P. bedfordi

Binomial name
- Proedromys bedfordi Thomas, 1911

Synonyms
- Microtus bedfordi (Thomas, 1911)

Species of rodent

The Duke of Bedford's vole (Proedromys bedfordi) is a species of rodent in the family Cricetidae. After the Liangshan vole was removed from this genus, the Duke of Bedford's vole became the only member of the genus Proedromys. It is found only in mountainous parts of central China. It is a rare species and the International Union for Conservation of Nature has assessed its conservation status as being "vulnerable".

== Description ==
The Duke of Bedford's vole has a head-and-body length of between 75 and 100 mm (3 and 4 in) and a tail length of 14 to 15 mm (0.55 to 0.59 in). The dorsal fur is long and a dull shade of mid-brown, the underparts are whitish-grey. The upper surface of both fore and hind feet is whitish, and the tail is bicoloured, being brown above and whitish below. The skull is robust, the broad incisors are recurved and have grooves on their outer surfaces, and the molars have no roots and continue to grow throughout the animal's life.

== Distribution and habitat ==
The Duke of Bedford's vole is a rare species and is known from only three localities in China; two of these are in southern Gansu Province and northern Sichuan Province, and the third is the Jiuzhaigou National Nature Reserve, where the vole was discovered for the first time in 2003. It is a forest dweller and has been found at elevations between 2,440 and 2,550 m (8,000 and 8,400 ft). It is also known from fossilised remains and appears to have been more plentiful in the Pleistocene age than it is now.

== Status ==
Very little is known of this vole, the size of the total population, the population trend and the area of occupancy. Its extent of occurrence is probably under 20,000 km^{2} (7,722 mi^{2}). The main threat it faces is the destruction of its mountain habitat by logging or conversion to cropland. Because of its small area of occurrence and these other factors, the International Union for Conservation of Nature has assessed the vole's conservation status as being "vulnerable".
