= Tien Shan vole =

Conservation status
- Least Concern (IUCN 3.1)

Scientific classification
- Kingdom: Animalia
- Phylum: Chordata
- Class: Mammalia
- Order: Rodentia
- Family: Cricetidae
- Subfamily: Arvicolinae
- Genus: Microtus
- Subgenus: Microtus
- Species: M. ilaeus

Binomial name
- Microtus ilaeus Thomas, 1912

Synonyms
- Microtus kirgisorum (Ognev, 1950)

Species of rodent

The Tien Shan vole (Microtus ilaeus) is a species of rodent in the family Cricetidae. It is found in Afghanistan, Kazakhstan, Kyrgyzstan, Tajikistan, and Turkmenistan.
