= Bomi mountain vole =

Scientific classification
- Kingdom: Animalia
- Phylum: Chordata
- Class: Mammalia
- Order: Rodentia
- Family: Cricetidae
- Subfamily: Arvicolinae
- Genus: Neodon
- Species: N. bomiensis

Binomial name
- Neodon bomiensis S. Liu, Zhou, Murphy, & Y. Liu, 2022

Species of rodent

The Bomi mountain vole (Neodon bomiensis) is a species of rodent in the family Cricetidae. It is found only in China.

== See also ==
- List of living mammal species described in the 2020s
