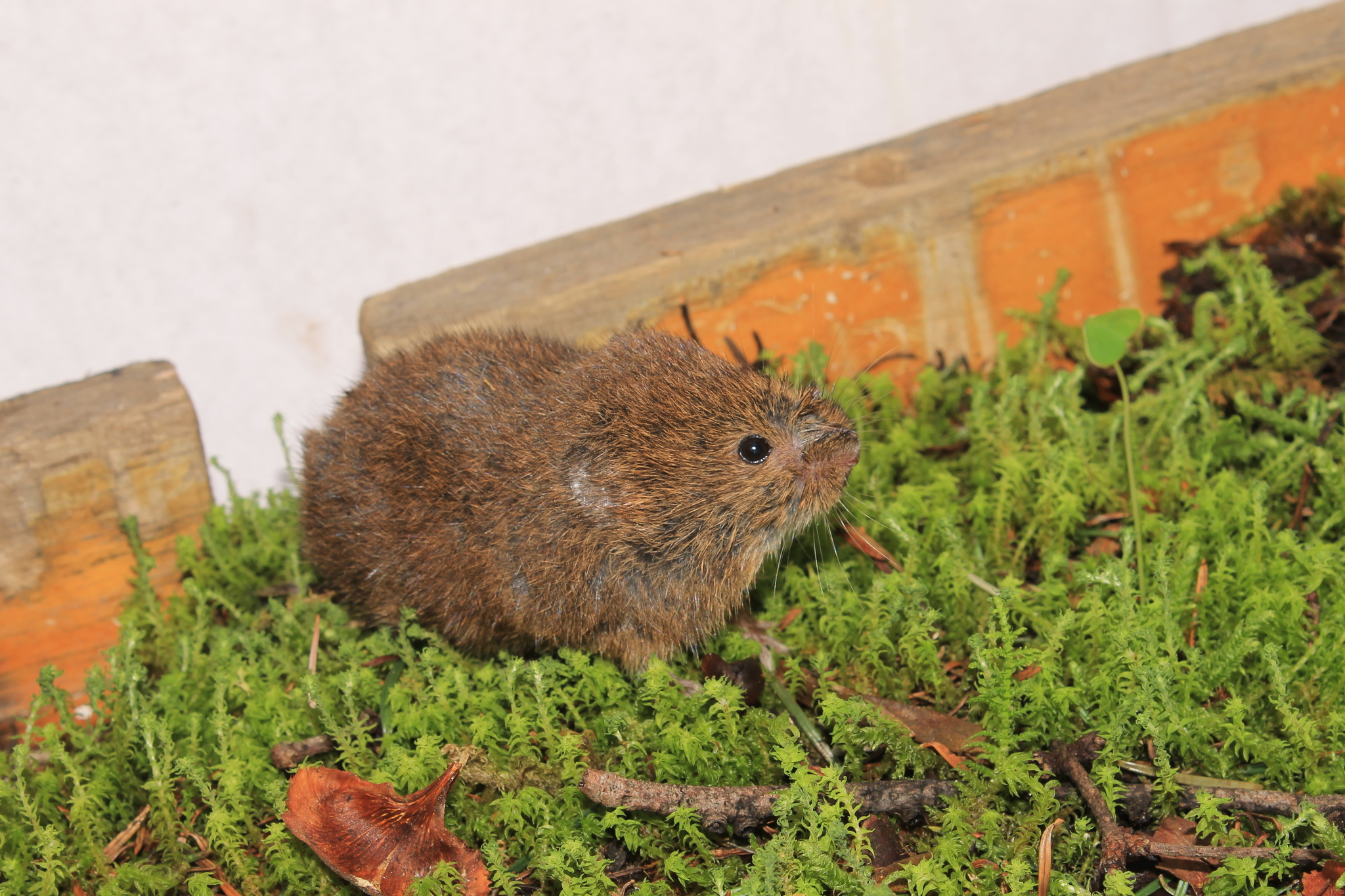

Conservation status
- Least Concern (IUCN 3.1)

Scientific classification
- Kingdom: Animalia
- Phylum: Chordata
- Class: Mammalia
- Order: Rodentia
- Family: Cricetidae
- Subfamily: Arvicolinae
- Genus: Microtus
- Subgenus: Mynomes
- Species: M. mexicanus

Binomial name
- Microtus mexicanus (Saussure, 1861)

Synonyms
- Microtus mogollonensis (Mearns, 1890)

= Mexican vole =

Species of rodent

The Mexican vole (Microtus mexicanus) is a species of vole.

The Hualapai Mexican vole (M. m. hualapaiensis) was formerly recognized as a subspecies and was a protected taxon under the United States Endangered Species Act until 2017. Several other populations of the vole were previously named subspecies but are no longer recognized as distinct.

This species has a disjunct distribution in the southwestern United States and Mexico. It can be found in grasslands and other habitat types and is generally adaptable to a range of climate types.

The Mexican vole mainly feeds on grasses and the roots of shrubs and trees.(Beacham, 2000) In several studies, the Mexican vole was baited using two plant products, barley and oatmeal. It has also been noted to eat monarch butterflies.

The earliest description of the species was in 1861 by Swiss entomologist Henri de Saussure, a Swiss entomologist. Separate populations which appeared to have different morphologies were sometimes named subspecies, such as Microtus mexicanus mogollonensis, M. m. hualpaiensis, and M. m. navaho. Research continues on the relationships of different clades within the species.
