= Nyalam mountain vole =

Scientific classification
- Kingdom: Animalia
- Phylum: Chordata
- Class: Mammalia
- Order: Rodentia
- Family: Cricetidae
- Subfamily: Arvicolinae
- Genus: Neodon
- Species: N. nyalamensis

Binomial name
- Neodon nyalamensis S. Liu, Jin, Y. Liu, Murphy, Lv, Hao, Liao, Sun, Tang, Chen & Fu, 2016

Species of rodent

The Nyalam mountain vole (Neodon nyalamensis) is a species of rodent belonging to the family Cricetidae. It is found only in China.
