= Schelkovnikov's pine vole =

Conservation status
- Least Concern (IUCN 3.1)

Scientific classification
- Kingdom: Animalia
- Phylum: Chordata
- Class: Mammalia
- Order: Rodentia
- Family: Cricetidae
- Subfamily: Arvicolinae
- Genus: Microtus
- Subgenus: Hyrcanicola; Nadachowski, 2007
- Species: M. schelkovnikovi

Binomial name
- Microtus schelkovnikovi Satunin, 1907

Species of mammal

Schelkovnikov's pine vole (Microtus schelkovnikovi) is a species of rodent in the family Cricetidae. It is found in Azerbaijan and Iran. It has recently been considered the sole species in the subgenus Hyrcanicola.
