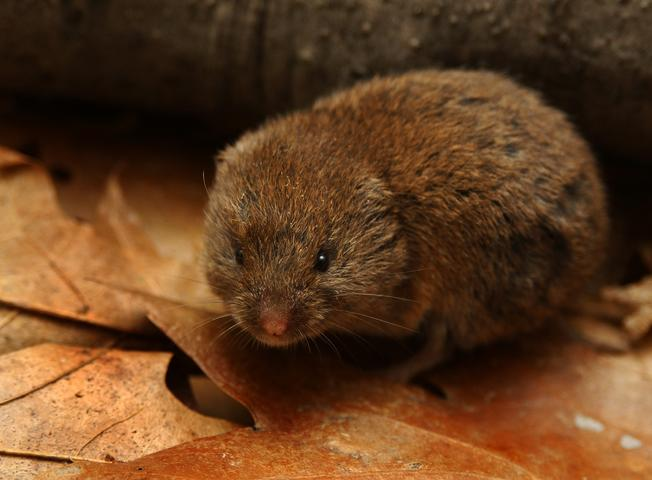

Conservation status
- Least Concern (IUCN 3.1)

Scientific classification
- Kingdom: Animalia
- Phylum: Chordata
- Class: Mammalia
- Order: Rodentia
- Family: Cricetidae
- Subfamily: Arvicolinae
- Genus: Microtus
- Subgenus: Pitymys
- Species: M. pinetorum

Binomial name
- Microtus pinetorum (Le Conte, 1830)

= Woodland vole =

Species of rodent

The woodland vole (Microtus pinetorum) is a small vole found in eastern North America. It is also known as the pine vole.

== Characteristics ==
The woodland vole has a head and body length ranging between 3.25–4.75 in (83–121 mm) with a 0.5–1.5 in (13–38 mm) short tail. Its weight ranges between 0.5–1.3 oz (14–37 g). It has a brown (light or dark) dorsal region with a whitish or silvery underside. The eyes, external ears and tail are reduced to adapt to their partially subterranean lifestyle.

== Ecology ==
The woodland vole lives throughout the eastern United States, ranging as far as Nebraska, Kansas, Oklahoma, and Texas. They inhabit deciduous forests, dry fields, and apple orchards. Voles prefer wooded areas with high vertical vegetative stratification but also evergreen shrubs, ground cover, and old fallen logs. Deciduous forests with moist, friable soils are suitable for burrowing and voles are most abundant in these habitats. However, they can also be found in other habitats from dry fields to the edges of coastal bays. In addition, apple orchards are a favorite habitat. The root systems of trees are an important food source for vole and thus tree spacing affects the density of vole populations.

Voles prefer to live in soils ranging from loam/peat moss mixtures, to gravel or stone soils, but not very dry soils. Alfisol and Ultisol soil types are particularly favored due to being favorable to the vole's burrowing system. Voles feed on both the roots and stem system and the vegetation of plants, as well as fruits, seeds, bark, subterranean fungus and insects. Because they feed on roots and tubers, voles do not need to drink water much. Voles cache food, primarily during the winter. Voles spend most of their time underground in their burrow systems and seldom venture into the surface. This makes them safe from hawks and owls. Other predators of voles include snakes, weasels and mountain lions. They are also susceptible to ectoparasites like lice, fleas, mites, and chiggers.

== Social behavior and reproduction ==
Woodland voles live in family groups in burrow systems in home ranges around 14.75-17.75 in (40–45 cm). The burrows are exclusive to the family groups, however a group usually does not need to defend its burrows as other voles usually will not invade them. The size and location of the home range and dispersal of groups are limited by neighboring family groups. Family groups of the vole are made of a breeding female, a breeding male, their 1–4 offspring and sometimes a few other members that serve as helpers. Helpers are immigrants from other groups. Group emigration is uncommon and dependent on whether there are available positions in other groups. Staying in a group as a non-breeding individual is beneficial as burrow systems are major investments and a limited resource.

In the north, the breeding season lasts from March to sometime between November and January. In the south, the breeding season continues throughout the year. In order to enter estrus, a female must sense chemosignals in a male and have physical contact. Because females are dispersed with little overlap of different colonies, polygamy is rare among voles. In addition, the breeding female in a family group will stress the reproduction of female helpers. Females are fiercely loyal to their partners and are highly aggressive towards unfamiliar males. A young female vole usually first conceives around 105 days but can conceive as early as 77 days. A female will develop a vaginal plug after copulation which lasts for three days. Gestation lasts 20–24 days with 1–4 litters produced per year, each with 1–5 young. When a vole's partner dies, it is replaced by an unrelated individual. This results in a conflict between the surviving parent and its offspring of the same sexes for mating opportunities. A new male in a group gives a non-breeding female a chance to breed although the resident breeding female is still an obstacle.

== Interactions with humans ==
Woodland voles create high economic loss through the damage they cause to apple orchards. Vole feeding costs apple growers annual losses of nearly $50 million. As such farmers see them as pests. Urban environments have little impact on vole habitat selection.
