= Sikkim mountain vole =

Conservation status
- Least Concern (IUCN 3.1)

Scientific classification
- Kingdom: Animalia
- Phylum: Chordata
- Class: Mammalia
- Order: Rodentia
- Family: Cricetidae
- Subfamily: Arvicolinae
- Genus: Neodon
- Species: N. sikimensis

Binomial name
- Neodon sikimensis (Horsfield, 1841)

Species of rodent

The Sikkim mountain vole (Neodon sikimensis) is a species of rodent in the family Cricetidae. It is found in Bhutan, India, Nepal and China.

== Description ==
The Sikkim mountain vole has a head-and-body length of between 97 and 119 mm (3.82 and 4.69 in) and a tail length of 30 to 52 mm (1.18 to 2.05 in). The dorsal fur is dark brown, the underparts are dark grey and there is an intermediate strip of ochre-brown where the two colours meet. The upper surface of both fore and hind feet are brownish-white and the tail is bicoloured, being brown above and white below. The Sikkim mountain vole is very similar in appearance to the Chinese scrub vole (N. irene) although the two can be distinguished by examination of their teeth.

== Distribution and habitat ==
The Sikkim mountain vole is native to parts of southeastern Asia. Its range extends from Bhutan, West Bengal and Sikkim in India, through western, central and eastern Nepal at altitudes above 2,500 m (8,200 ft), and it is also present in southern Tibet Autonomous Region at altitudes between 2,100 and 3,700 m (6,900 and 12,100 ft). Its typical habitat is Alpine meadows, rough herbage, forest edges and clearings.

== Status ==
The Sikkim mountain vole has a wide range and is assumed to have a large total population. It is present in several protected areas including Langtang National Park and Khangchendzonga National Park. The population trend is unknown, but the vole is threatened by the disappearance of areas of suitable habitat, by the arrival of invasive species and by the predation of domestic dogs and cats. The International Union for Conservation of Nature has assessed its conservation status as being of "least concern".
