= Linzhi mountain vole =

Conservation status
- Data Deficient (IUCN 3.1)

Scientific classification
- Kingdom: Animalia
- Phylum: Chordata
- Class: Mammalia
- Order: Rodentia
- Family: Cricetidae
- Subfamily: Arvicolinae
- Genus: Neodon
- Species: N. linzhiensis

Binomial name
- Neodon linzhiensis S. Liu, Sun, Y. Liu, Wang, Guo & Murphy, 2012

Species of rodent

The Linzhi mountain vole (Neodon linzhiensis) is a species of rodent in the family Cricetidae. It is endemic to mountainous parts of southern China.
