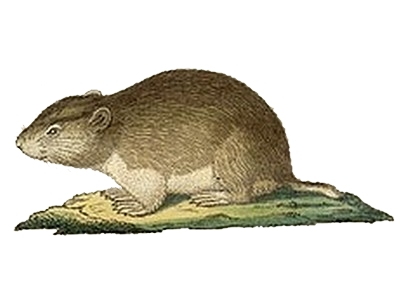

Conservation status
- Least Concern (IUCN 3.1)

Scientific classification
- Domain: Eukaryota
- Kingdom: Animalia
- Phylum: Chordata
- Class: Mammalia
- Order: Rodentia
- Family: Cricetidae
- Subfamily: Arvicolinae
- Genus: Microtus
- Subgenus: Microtus
- Species: M. socialis

Binomial name
- Microtus socialis (Pallas, 1773)

= Social vole =

Species of rodent

The social vole (Microtus socialis) is a species of rodent in the family Cricetidae. It is found in China, Iran, Kazakhstan, Syria, Turkey, Tajikistan, Kyrgyzstan, Russia, Georgia, Azerbaijan, Armenia and Ukraine. It may also be found in northern Iraq, where either this species and/or the closely related Doğramaci's vole is found.
