= Jalapan pine vole =

Conservation status
- Near Threatened (IUCN 3.1)

Scientific classification
- Kingdom: Animalia
- Phylum: Chordata
- Class: Mammalia
- Order: Rodentia
- Family: Cricetidae
- Subfamily: Arvicolinae
- Genus: Microtus
- Subgenus: Pitymys
- Species: M. quasiater

Binomial name
- Microtus quasiater (Coues, 1874)

Synonyms
- Pitymys quasiater Coues, 1874 Pitymys pinetorum quasiater Coues, 1874

Species of rodent

The Jalapan pine vole (Microtus quasiater) is a species of rodent in the family Cricetidae, found only in Mexico. The scientific name quasiater translates as "almost black", while the common name refers to the city of Jalapa, close to where the first specimen was collected.

== Description ==
The Jalapan pine vole is the smallest species of vole found in Mexico, with an adult body length of 10 to 14 centimetres (3.9 to 5.5 in) and an average weight of 26 grams (0.92 oz). The fur is long, soft, and dark brown in color, becoming paler on the underparts. There is no significant difference in size between males and females.

== Distribution and habitat ==
The Jalapan pine vole is known only from the Sierra Madre Oriental, ranging from southern San Luis Potosi to northern Oaxaca. Within this region it inhabits mountainous cloud forests between 700 and 2,150 metres (2,300 and 7,050 ft) in elevation. It is most commonly found in grassy clearings, along river banks or in marshy wetlands or the boundaries of agricultural land, but occasionally inhabits denser woodland dominated by pine and oak, often with an undergrowth of heavy ferns.

== Biology and behavior ==
Like other voles, the Jalapan species is herbivorous. It is known to feed on at least 36 different species of plant, with the bulk of the diet consisting of the leaves and stems of grasses, sedges, and herbs, with some roots, seeds, flowers, and fungi. Together, these constitute most of the available small plants in the areas it inhabits, suggesting that it is an adaptable generalist feeder.

The species is nocturnal, spending the day under rocks or fallen logs. It breeds year-round, but more commonly during the rainy season, giving birth to litters of one to four young. They have been reported to grow quickly, reaching the full adult size about a month after birth.
