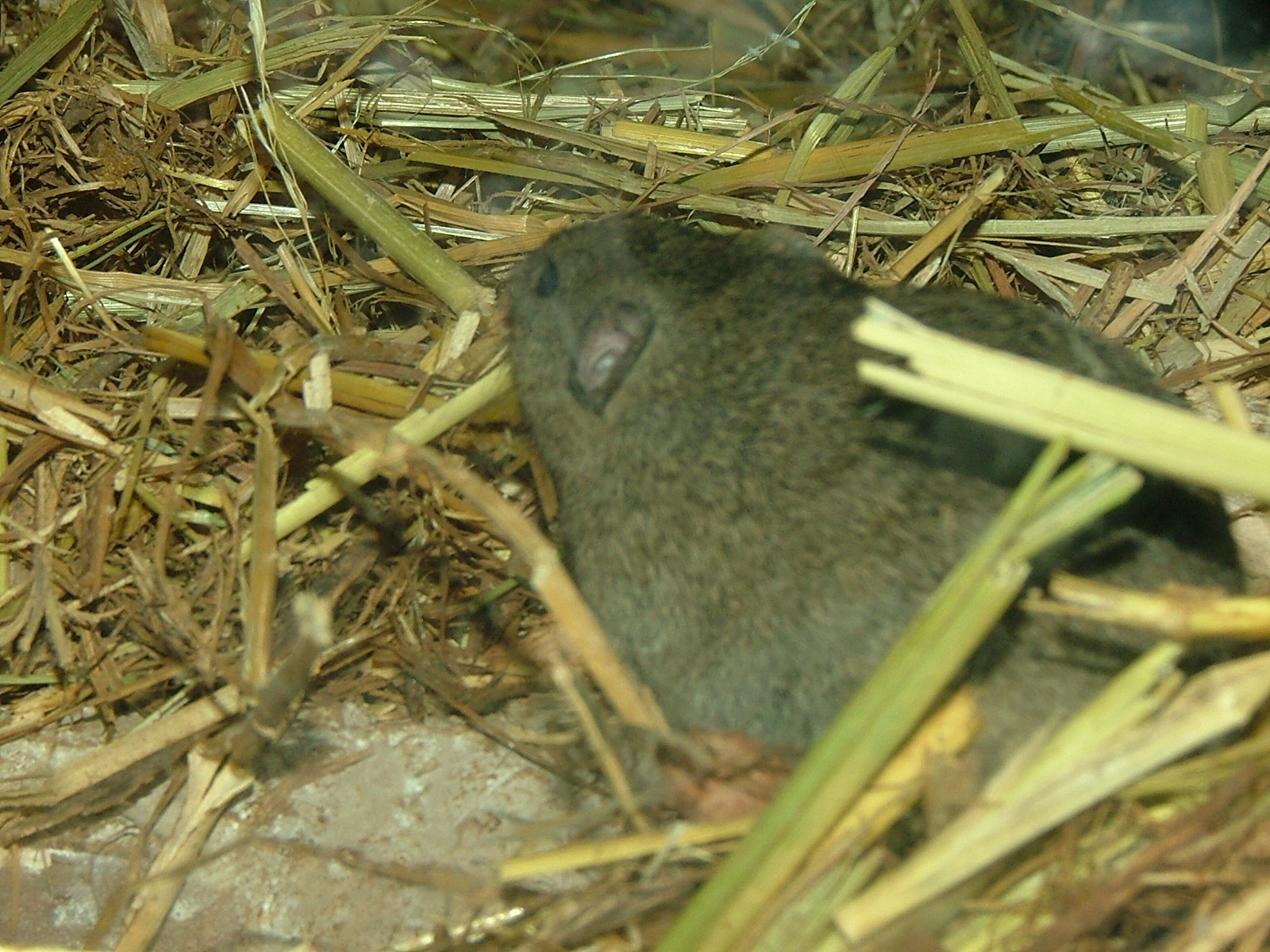
- A Günther's Vole in Jerusalem Biblical Zoo

Conservation status
- Least Concern (IUCN 3.1)

Scientific classification
- Kingdom: Animalia
- Phylum: Chordata
- Class: Mammalia
- Order: Rodentia
- Family: Cricetidae
- Subfamily: Arvicolinae
- Genus: Microtus
- Subgenus: Microtus
- Species: M. guentheri

Binomial name
- Microtus guentheri (Danford & Alston, 1880)

Synonyms
- mustersi Ranck, 1968

= Günther's vole =

Species of rodent

Günther's vole (Microtus guentheri) is a species of rodent in the family Cricetidae, also known by the name Levant vole. It is found in Bulgaria, Greece, Iran, Iraq, Israel, Jordan, Lebanon, North Macedonia, Serbia, Montenegro, Syria, Turkey, and Libya. In Libya, its natural habitats are temperate grassland, subtropical or tropical high-altitude grassland, and arable land. In Israel, it is common in lowland agricultural fields, in peak years becoming a major crop pest.
