= Neodon =

Scientific classification
- Domain: Eukaryota
- Kingdom: Animalia
- Phylum: Chordata
- Class: Mammalia
- Order: Rodentia
- Family: Cricetidae
- Subfamily: Arvicolinae
- Tribe: Microtini
- Genus: Neodon; Horsfield, 1851

Type species
- Neodon sikimensis Horsfield, 1841

Species
- Neodon bershulaensis Neodon bomiensis Neodon chayuensis Neodon clarkei Neodon forresti Neodon fuscus Neodon irene Neodon leucurus Neodon liaoruii Neodon linzhiensis Neodon medogensis Neodon namchabarwaensis Neodon nepalensis Neodon nyalamensis Neodon shergylaensis Neodon sikimensis

Genus of rodents

Neodon is a genus of rodent in the family Cricetidae. Species within Neodon are classified as relics of the Pleistocene epoch because the occlusal patterns resemble the extinct Allophaiomys.

While the IUCN only recognizes 6 species of Neodon, the American Society of Mammalogists lists the following species, with Neodon leucurus being moved into this genus from Phaiomys and the additional 9 species being recently described:

- Bershula mountain vole (Neodon bershulaensis)
- Bomi mountain vole (Neodon bomiensis)
- Chayu mountain vole (Neodon chayuensis)
- Clarke's vole (Neodon clarkei)
- Forrest's mountain vole (Neodon forresti)
- Plateau vole (Neodon fuscus)
- Chinese scrub vole (Neodon irene)
- Blyth's vole (Neodon leucurus)
- Liao Rui's mountain vole (Neodon liaoruii)
- Linzhi mountain vole (Neodon linzhiensis)
- Medog mountain vole (Neodon medogensis)
- Namchabarwa mountain vole (Neodon namchabarwaensis)
- Nepalese mountain vole (Neodon nepalensis)
- Nyalam mountain vole (Neodon nyalamensis)
- Shergyla mountain vole (Neodon shergylaensis)
- Sikkim mountain vole (Neodon sikimensis)
