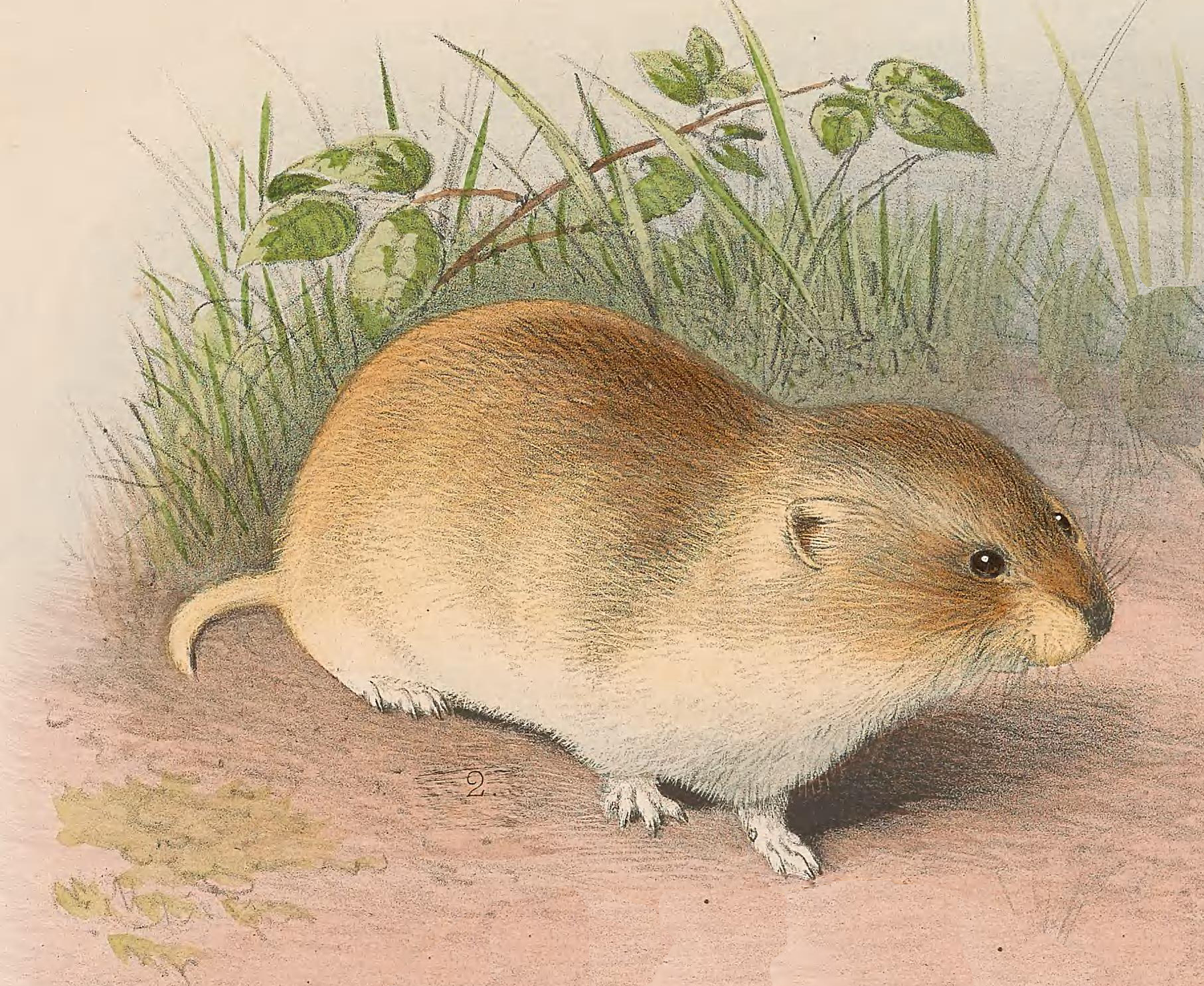

Conservation status
- Least Concern (IUCN 3.1)

Scientific classification
- Kingdom: Animalia
- Phylum: Chordata
- Class: Mammalia
- Order: Rodentia
- Family: Cricetidae
- Subfamily: Arvicolinae
- Tribe: Microtini
- Genus: Neodon
- Species: N. leucurus

Binomial name
- Neodon leucurus (Blyth, 1863)

Synonyms
- Phaiomys leucurus

= Blyth's vole =

Species of rodent

Blyth's vole (Neodon leucurus) is a species of rodent in the family Cricetidae. It was previously the only species in the genus Phaiomys, but was moved to Neodon in 2016. It is found in mountainous regions in northern India, Nepal and China. It is a burrowing rodent and lives in small colonies. It has a wide distribution and faces no particular threats so the International Union for Conservation of Nature has assessed its conservation status as being of "least concern".

== Description ==
Blyth's vole has a head-and-body length of between 98 and 128 mm (3.86 and 5.04 in) and a tail length of 26 to 35 mm (1.02 to 1.38 in). The dorsal fur is light yellowish-brown, the underparts are yellowish-grey and there is a gradual transition where the two colours meet. The upper surface of both fore and hind feet is yellowish-white, and the tail is unicoloured, being yellowish-brown both above and below. The ears are small and rounded and the claws long, both being adaptations for living underground.

== Distribution and habitat ==
Blyth's vole is native to northern India, Nepal and the Tibetan Plateau in the provinces of Xinjiang, the Tibet Autonomous Region and Qinghai in western China, at altitudes of over 4,500 m (14,800 ft). It inhabits forests and Alpine grassland on rocky mountains, burrowing especially in the banks of rivers and lakes, and sometimes tunnelling under boulders and making use of crevices between rocks. It also moves along passageways that it makes under lying snow.

== Behaviour ==
Blyth's vole is a diurnal vole that mostly lives underground, with up to twenty individuals living colonially in a deep burrow system. It feeds on vegetable matter and can have litters of as many as seven offspring.

== Status ==
Blyth's vole has a wide range and is assumed to have a large total population but has not been recorded from any particular protected areas. The population trend is unknown, but no particular threats have been identified other than loss of habitat, and the International Union for Conservation of Nature has assessed the vole's conservation status as being of "least concern".
