= Chinese scrub vole =

Conservation status
- Least Concern (IUCN 3.1)

Scientific classification
- Kingdom: Animalia
- Phylum: Chordata
- Class: Mammalia
- Order: Rodentia
- Family: Cricetidae
- Subfamily: Arvicolinae
- Genus: Neodon
- Species: N. irene

Binomial name
- Neodon irene (Thomas, 1911)

Species of rodent

The Chinese scrub vole, or Irene's mountain vole, (Neodon irene) is a species of rodent in the family Cricetidae. It is endemic to mountainous parts of southern China and is very similar to the Sikkim mountain vole in appearance. The International Union for Conservation of Nature has assessed its conservation status as being of "least concern".

== Description ==
The Chinese scrub vole has a head-and-body length of between 80 and 108 mm (3.15 and 4.25 in) and a tail length of 22 to 40 mm (0.87 to 1.57 in). The dorsal fur is greyish-brown, the underparts are dark grey and there is an intermediate strip of ochre-brown where the two colours meet. The upper surface of both fore and hind feet are brownish-white and the tail is bicoloured, being brown above and white below. The Chinese scrub vole is very similar in appearance to the Sikkim mountain vole (Neodon sikimensis), but it is slightly smaller and the two can be distinguished by examination of their dentition.

== Distribution and habitat ==
The Chinese scrub vole is endemic to China where it occurs in high mountains in the provinces of eastern Qinghai, southern Gansu, western Sichuan, northeastern Tibet Autonomous Region and northwestern Yunnan. It is usually found in Alpine meadows and on shrubby hillsides.

== Behaviour ==
Like other voles, the Chinese scrub vole feeds mainly on plant material. Little is known of its reproductive biology, but a female with three advanced-stage embryos has been found in August.

== Status ==
The Chinese scrub vole has a wide range and is assumed to have a large total population. It is present in several national nature reserves. The population trend is unknown, but no specific threats have been identified and the International Union for Conservation of Nature has assessed its conservation status as being of "least concern".
