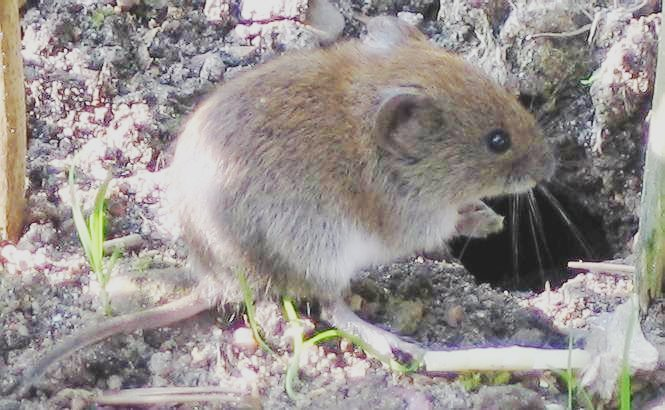
- The bank vole (Myodes glareolus) lives in woodland areas in Europe and Asia.

Scientific classification
- Kingdom: Animalia
- Phylum: Chordata
- Class: Mammalia
- Order: Rodentia
- Family: Cricetidae
- Subfamily: Arvicolinae

Groups included
- Arvicolini; Ellobiusini – mole voles; Microtini; Clethrionomyini; Phenacomyini – tree and heather voles; Pliomyini; Prometheomyini

Cladistically included but traditionally excluded taxa
- Dicrostonychini - collared lemmings; Lagurini; Lemmini; Ondatrini - muskrats

= Vole =

Type of small omnivorous rodent

Voles are small rodents that are relatives of lemmings and hamsters, but with a stouter body; a longer, hairy tail; a slightly rounder head; smaller eyes and ears; and differently formed molars (high-crowned with angular cusps instead of low-crowned with rounded cusps). They are sometimes known as meadow mice or field mice.

Vole species form the subfamily Arvicolinae with the lemmings and the muskrats. There are approximately 155 different vole species.

== Description ==
Voles are small rodents that grow to 8–23 cm (3–9 in), depending on the species. Most voles do not exceed 16 months in age in the wild, though in captivity they may live as long as three years. The vole mating season spans about half the year (from spring to fall) with litters produced monthly. Each litter is usually made up of two to nine offspring. Gestation lasts for three weeks and the young voles reach sexual maturity in a month. As a result of this biological exponential growth, vole populations can grow very large within a short time. One mating pair can produce 100 offspring every year.

Voles outwardly resemble several other small animals. Moles, gophers, mice, rats and even shrews have similar characteristics and behavioral tendencies.

Voles thrive on small plants yet, like shrews, they will eat dead animals and, like mice and rats, they can live on almost any nut or fruit. In addition, voles target plants more than most other small animals, making their presence evident. Voles readily girdle small trees and ground cover much like a porcupine. This girdling can easily kill young plants and is not healthy for trees and other shrubs.

Voles consume their own body weight in plant material every 24 hours. Their most noticeable activity is burrowing under plants where they can access nutritious bulbs and root systems. They also eat herbaceous material and may eat away until the plant is dead. The presence of large numbers of voles is often identifiable only after they have destroyed a number of plants. However, like other burrowing rodents, they also play beneficial roles, including dispersing nutrients throughout the upper soil layers.

== Predators ==
Many predators eat voles, including martens, owls, hawks, falcons, coyotes, bobcats, foxes, raccoons, squirrels, snakes, weasels, domestic cats and lynxes. Vole bones are often found in the pellets of the short-eared owl, the northern spotted owl, the saw-whet owl, the barn owl, the great gray owl, and the northern pygmy owl. In the summer of 2024, biologists and other scientists at UC Davis first observed California ground squirrels actively hunting voles.

== Lifespan ==
Releasing water voles in the Vale of Glamorgan, Wales

The average lifespan for smaller species of vole is three to six months, and they rarely live longer than 12 months. Larger species, such as the European water vole, live longer and usually die during their second, or rarely their third, winter. As many as 88% of voles are estimated to die within the first month of life.

== Genetics and sexual behavior ==
The prairie vole is a notable animal model for its monogamous social fidelity, since the male is usually socially faithful to the female, and shares in the raising of pups. The woodland vole is also usually monogamous. Another species from the same genus, the meadow vole, has promiscuously mating males, and scientists have changed adult male meadow voles' behavior to resemble that of prairie voles in experiments in which a viral vector was used to increase a single gene's expression within a particular brain region.

The behavior is influenced by the number of repetitions of a particular string of microsatellite DNA. Male prairie voles with the longest DNA strings spend more time with their mates and pups than male prairie voles with shorter strings. However, other scientists have disputed the gene's relationship to monogamy, and cast doubt on whether the human version plays an analogous role. Physiologically, pair-bonding behavior has been shown to be connected to vasopressin, dopamine, and oxytocin levels, with the genetic influence apparently arising via the number of receptors for these substances in the brain; the pair-bonding behavior has also been shown in experiments to be strongly modifiable by administering some of these substances directly.

Voles have a number of unusual chromosomal traits. Species have been found with 17 to 64 chromosomes. In some species, males and females have different chromosome numbers, a trait unusual in mammals, though it is seen in other organisms. Additionally, genetic material typically found on the Y chromosome has been found in both males and females in at least one species. In another species, the X chromosome contains 20% of the genome. All of these variations result in very little physical aberration; most vole species are virtually indistinguishable. In one species, the creeping vole Microtus oregoni, it was discovered the Y chromosome has been lost entirely; the male-determining chromosome is actually a second X that is largely identical to the female X, and both the maternally inherited and male-specific sex chromosomes carry vestiges of the ancestral Y. This is quite unusual in mammals, as the XY system is fairly stable across a number of mammal species.

== Mating system ==
Voles may be either monogamous or polygamous, which leads to differing patterns of mate choice and parental care. Environmental conditions play a large part in dictating which system is active in a given population. Voles live in colonies due to the young remaining in the family group for relatively long periods. In the genus Microtus, monogamy is preferred when resources are spatially homogeneous and population densities are low; where the opposites of both conditions are realized, polygamous tendencies arise. Vole mating systems are also sensitive to the operational sex ratio and tend toward monogamy when males and females are present in equal numbers. Where one sex is more numerous than the other, polygamy is more likely. However the most marked effect on mating system is population density and these effects can take place both inter and intra-specifically.

Male voles are territorial and tend to include territories of several female voles when possible. Under these conditions polygyny exists and males offer little parental care. Males mark and aggressively defend their territories since females prefer males with the most recent marking in a given area.

Voles prefer familiar mates through olfactory sensory exploitation. Monogamous voles prefer males who have yet to mate, while non-monogamous voles do not. Mate preference in voles develops through cohabitation in as little as 24 hours. This drives young male voles to show non-limiting preference toward female siblings. This is not inclusive to females' preference for males which may help to explain the absence of interbreeding indicators.

Although females show little territoriality, under pair bonding conditions they tend to show aggression toward other female voles. This behavior is flexible as some Microtus females share dens during the winter months, perhaps to conserve heat and energy. Populations which are monogamous show relatively minor size differences between genders compared with those using polygamous systems.

The grey-sided vole (Myodes rufocanus) exhibits male-biased dispersal as a means of avoiding incestuous matings. Among those matings that involve inbreeding, the number of weaned juveniles in litters is significantly fewer than that from noninbred litters, due to inbreeding depression.

Brandt's vole (Lasiopodomys brandtii) lives in groups that mainly consist of close relatives. However, they show no sign of inbreeding. The mating system of these voles involves a type of polygyny for males and extra-group polyandry for females. This system increases the frequency of mating among distantly related individuals, and is achieved mainly by dispersal during the mating season. Such a strategy is likely an adaptation to avoid the inbreeding depression that would be caused by expression of deleterious recessive alleles if close relatives mated.

== Empathy and consolation ==
A 2016 study into the behavior of voles, Microtus ochrogaster specifically, found that voles comfort each other when mistreated, spending more time grooming a mistreated vole. Voles that were not mistreated had levels of stress hormones that were similar to the voles that had been mistreated, suggesting that the voles were capable of empathizing with each other. This was further proven by blocking the vole's receptors for oxytocin, a hormone involved in empathy. When the oxytocin receptors were blocked this behavior stopped.

This type of empathetic behavior has previously been thought to occur only in animals with advanced cognition, such as apes and elephants.

== Vole clock ==
The vole clock is a method of dating archaeological strata using vole teeth.

== Classification ==
- Order Rodentia
  - Superfamily Muroidea
    - Family Cricetidae
      - Subfamily Arvicolinae (in part)
        - Tribe Arvicolini
          - Genus Arvicola – water voles
          - Genus Blanfordimys – Afghan vole and Bucharian vole
          - Genus Chionomys – snow voles
          - Genus Lasiopodomys
          - Genus Lemmiscus – sagebrush vole
          - Genus Microtus – voles
          - Genus Neodon – mountain voles
          - Genus Phaiomys
          - Genus Proedromys – Duke of Bedford's vole
          - Genus Volemys
        - Tribe Ellobiusini – mole voles
          - Genus Ellobius – mole voles
        - Tribe Clethrionomyini
          - Genus Alticola – voles from Central Asia
          - Genus Caryomys
          - Genus Eothenomys – voles from East Asia
          - Genus Hyperacrius – voles from India (True's vole), Afghanistan and Pakistan (Murree's vole)
          - Genus Craseomys – some red-backed voles
          - Genus Clethrionomys - other red-backed voles
        - Tribe Phenacomyini
          - Genus Arborimus – tree voles
          - Genus Phenacomys – heather voles
        - Tribe Pliomyini
          - Genus Dinaromys – voles from the Dinaric Alps
