= List of mammals of Washington =

The orca is the state mammal of Washington

The list of mammals of Washington lists mammalian species that live in the U.S. state of Washington, including 9 introduced mammal species. The list does not include species found exclusively in captivity.

== Opossums ==
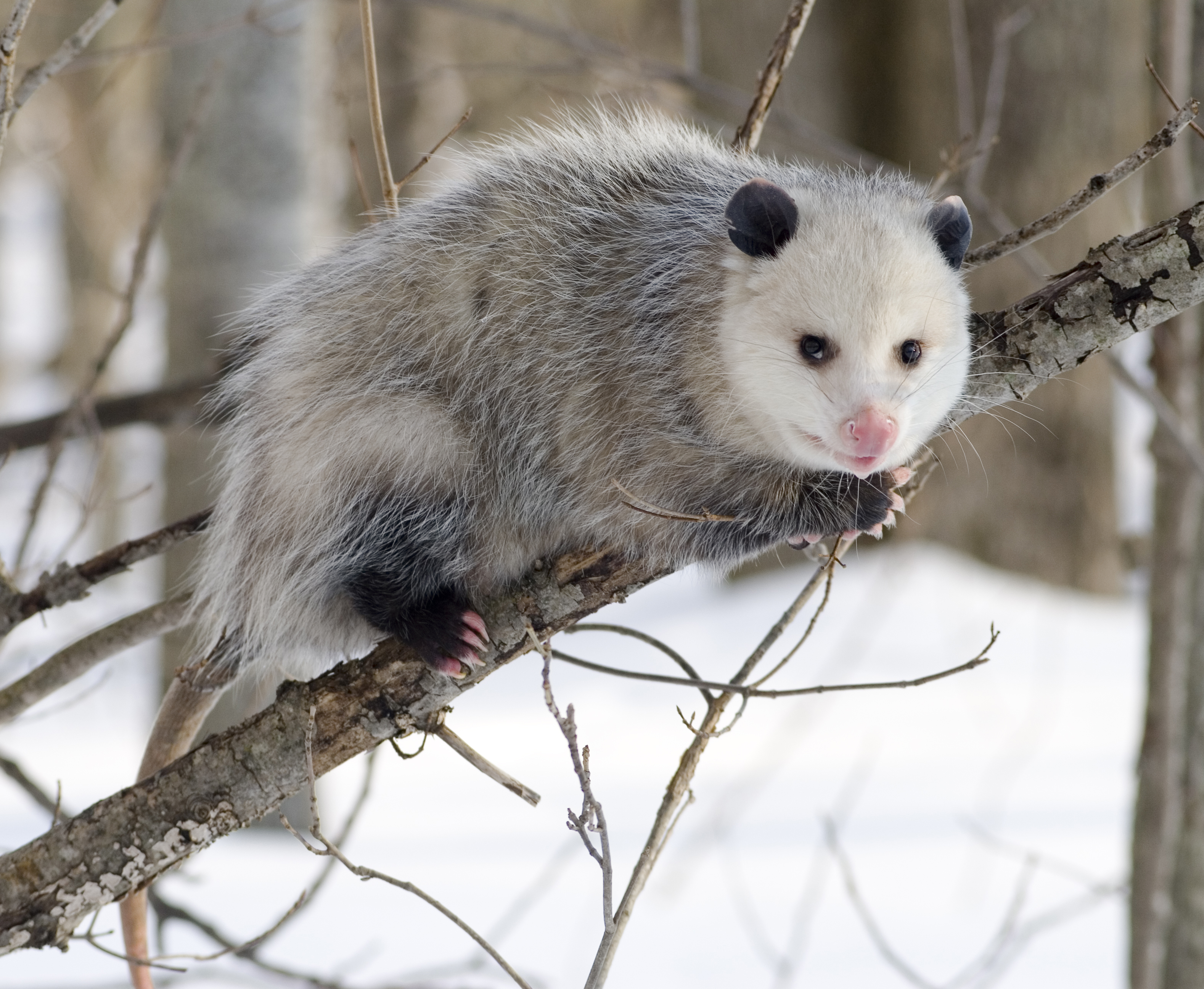
Virginia opossum

Family: Didelphidae

- Virginia opossum, Didelphis virginiana introduced

== Shrews and moles ==
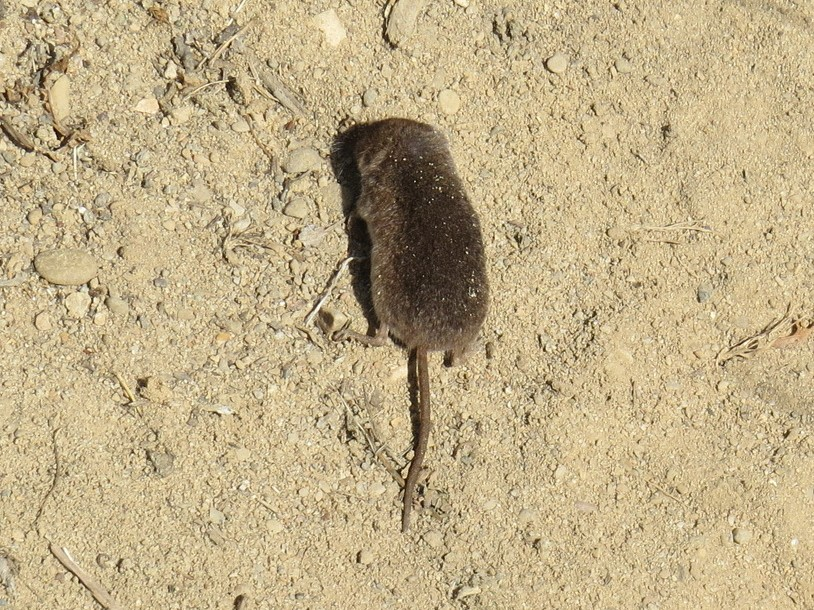
Vagrant shrew

Family: Soricidae

- Marsh shrew, Sorex bendirii
- Cinereus shrew, Sorex cinereus
- American pygmy shrew, Sorex hoyi
- Merriam's shrew, Sorex merriami
- Montane shrew, Sorex monticolus
- Preble's shrew, Sorex preblei
- Olympic shrew, Sorex rohweri
- Trowbridge's shrew, Sorex trowbridgii
- Vagrant shrew, Sorex vagrans

Family: Talpidae

- American shrew mole, Neurotrichus gibbsii
- Coast mole, Scapanus orarius
- Townsend's mole, Scapanus townsendii

== Bats ==
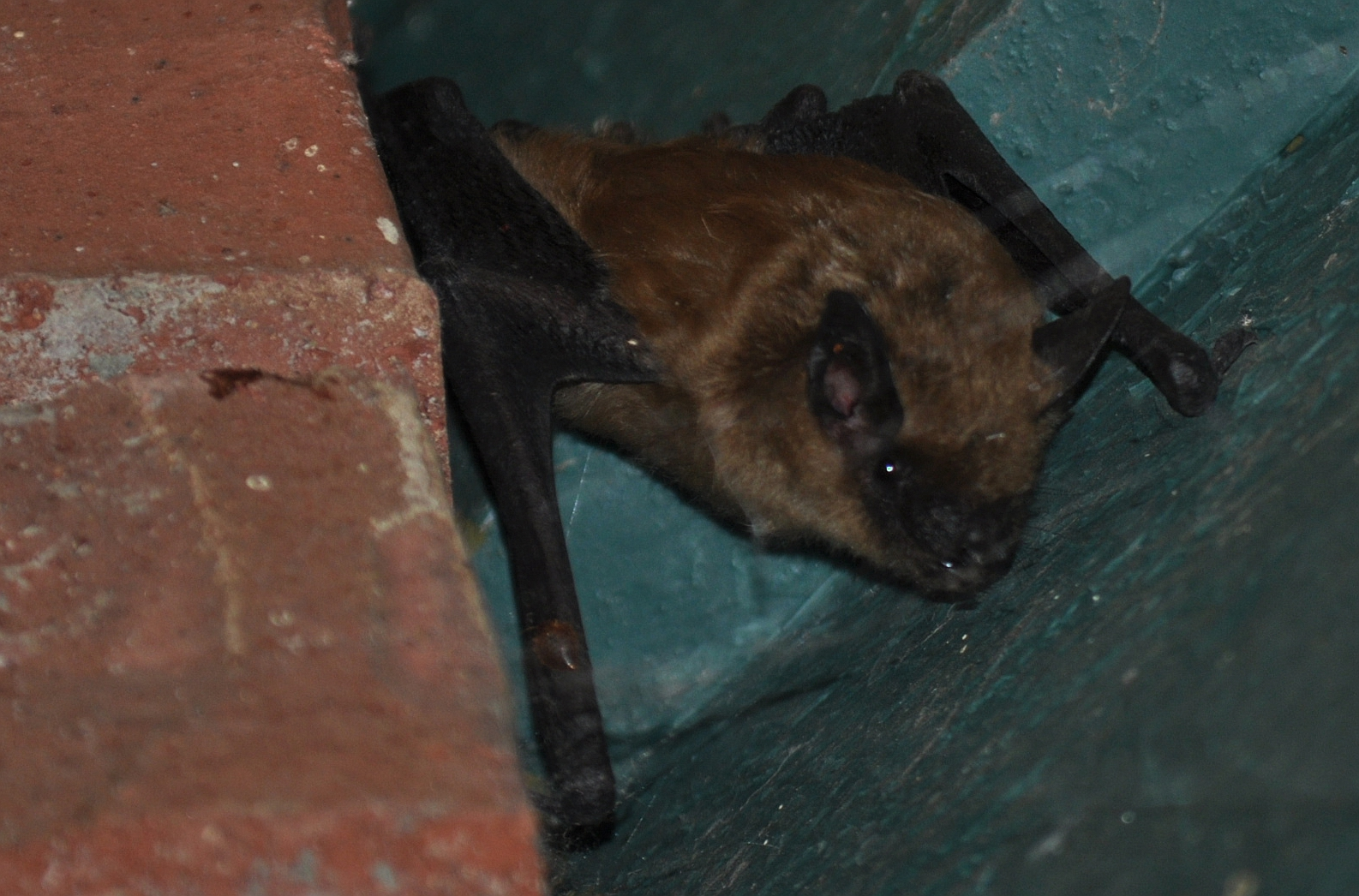
California myotis

Family: Vespertilionidae

- Pallid bat, Antrozous pallidus
- Townsend's big-eared bat, Corynorhinus townsendii
- Big brown bat, Eptesicus fuscus
- Spotted bat, Euderma maculatum
- Silver-haired bat, Lasionycteris noctivagans
- Hoary bat, Lasiurus cinereus
- California myotis, Myotis californicus
- Western small-footed myotis, Myotis ciliolabrum
- Long-eared myotis, Myotis evotis
- Keen's myotis, Myotis keenii
- Little brown myotis, Myotis lucifugus
- Fringed myotis, Myotis thysanodes
- Long-legged myotis, Myotis volans
- Yuma myotis, Myotis yumanensis
- Canyon bat, Parastrellus hesperus

== Lagomorphs ==
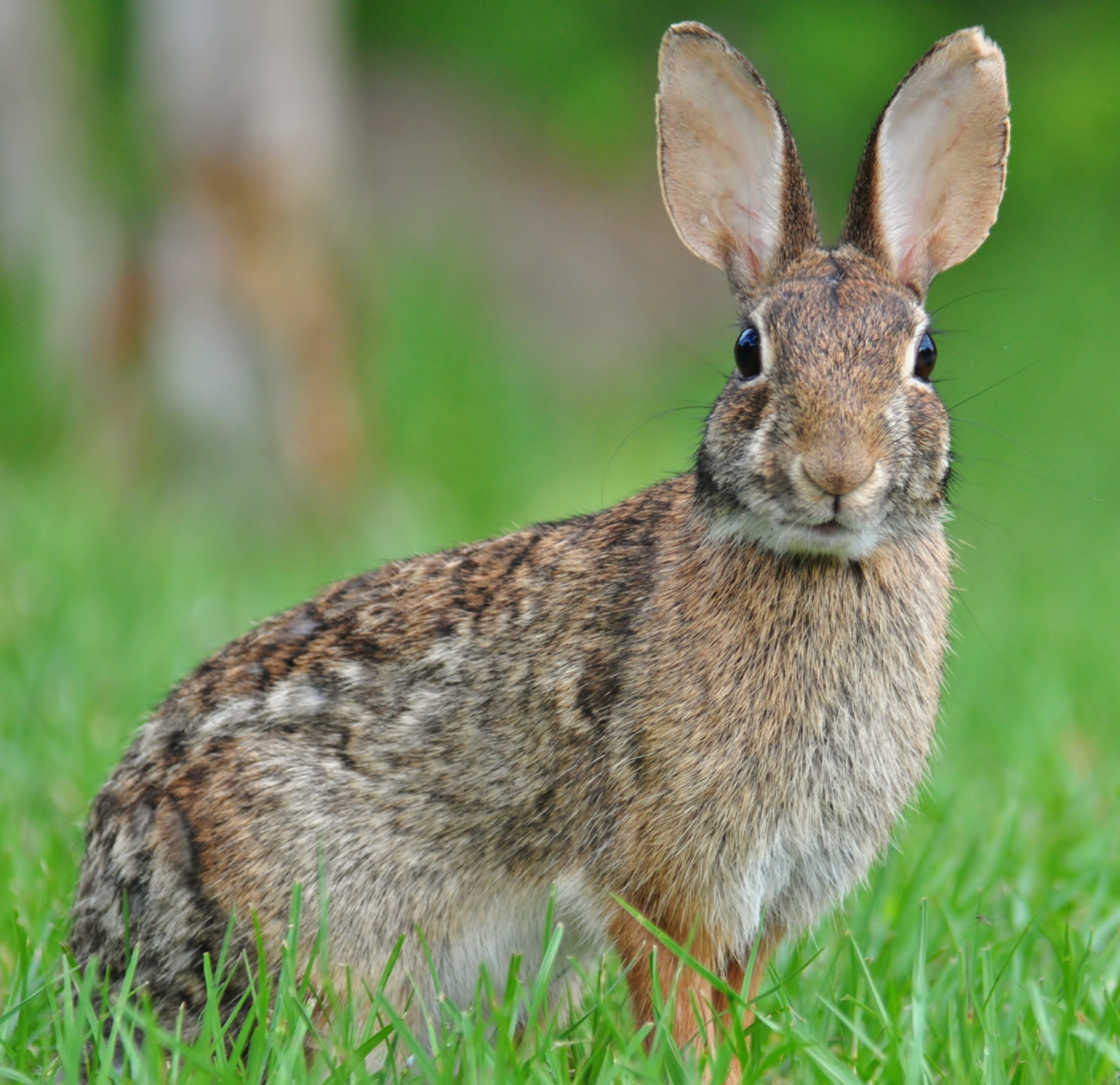
Eastern cottontail

Family: Ochotonidae

- American pika, Ochotona princeps

Family: Leporidae

- Pygmy rabbit, Brachylagus idahoensis
- Snowshoe hare, Lepus americanus
- Black-tailed jackrabbit, Lepus californicus
- White-tailed jackrabbit, Lepus townsendii
- European rabbit, Oryctolagus cuniculus introduced
- Eastern cottontail, Sylvilagus floridanus
- Mountain cottontail, Sylvilagus nuttallii

== Rodents ==
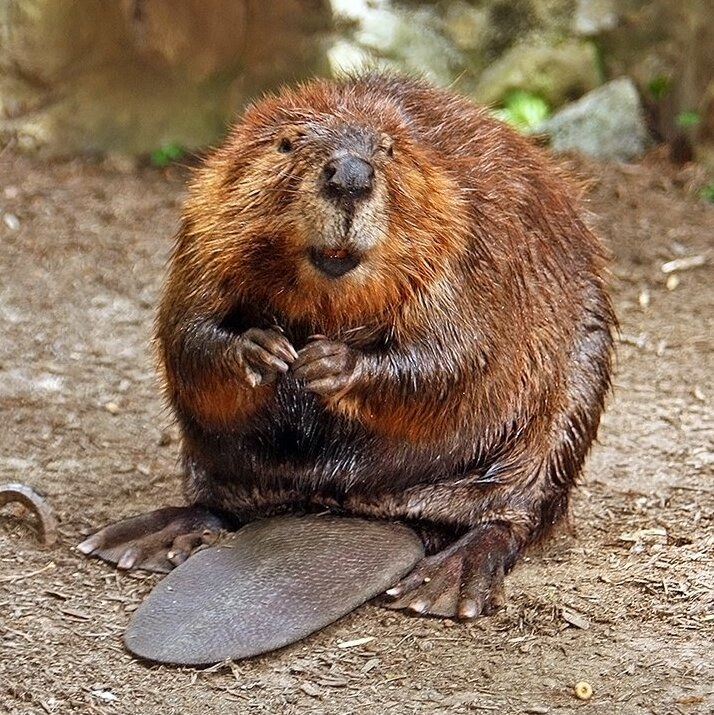
American beaver

Family: Aplodontiidae

- Mountain beaver, Aplodontia rufa

Family: Sciuridae

- Eastern gray squirrel, Sciurus carolinensis introduced
- Western gray squirrel, Sciurus griseus
- Fox squirrel, Sciurus niger
- Douglas squirrel, Tamiasciurus douglasii
- American red squirrel, Tamiasciurus hudsonicus
- Hoary marmot, Marmota caligata
- Yellow-bellied marmot, Marmota flaviventris
- Olympic marmot, Marmota olympus
- California ground squirrel, Otospermophilus beecheyi
- Golden-mantled ground squirrel, Callospermophilus lateralis
- Cascade golden-mantled ground squirrel, Callospermophilus saturatus
- Columbian ground squirrel, Urocitellus columbianus
- Piute ground squirrel, Urocitellus mollis
- Townsend's ground squirrel, Urocitellus townsendii
- Washington ground squirrel, Urocitellus washingtoni
- Yellow-pine chipmunk, Tamias amoenus
- Coulee chipmunk, Tamias grisescens
- Least chipmunk, Tamias minimus
- Red-tailed chipmunk, Tamias ruficaudus
- Townsend's chipmunk, Tamias townsendii
- Northern flying squirrel, Glaucomys sabrinus

Family: Castoridae

- American beaver, Castor canadensis

Family: Heteromyidae

- Ord's kangaroo rat, Dipodomys ordii
- Great Basin pocket mouse, Perognathus parvus

Family: Geomyidae

- Mazama pocket gopher, Thomomys mazama
- Northern pocket gopher, Thomomys talpoides

Family: Zapodidae

- Western jumping mouse, Zapus princeps
- Pacific jumping mouse, Zapus trinotatus

Family: Cricetidae

- Sagebrush vole, Lemmiscus curtatus
- Gray-tailed vole, Microtus canicaudus
- Long-tailed vole, Microtus longicaudus
- Montane vole, Microtus montanus
- Creeping vole, Microtus oregoni
- Western meadow vole, Microtus drummondii
- Water vole, Microtus richardsoni
- Townsend's vole, Microtus townsendii
- Southern red-backed vole, Clethrionomys gapperi
- Muskrat, Ondatra zibethicus
- Western heather vole, Phenacomys intermedius
- Northern bog lemming, Synaptomys borealis
- Bushy-tailed woodrat, Neotoma cinerea
- Northern grasshopper mouse, Onychomys leucogaster
- Western deer mouse, Peromyscus sonoriensis
- Northwestern deer mouse, Peromyscus keeni
- Western harvest mouse, Reithrodontomys megalotis

Family: Muridae

- House mouse, Mus musculus introduced
- Norway rat, Rattus norvegicus introduced
- Black rat, Rattus rattus introduced

North American porcupine

Family: Erethizontidae

- North American porcupine, Erethizon dorsatum

Family: Myocastoridae

- Nutria, Myocastor coypus introduced

== Carnivorans ==
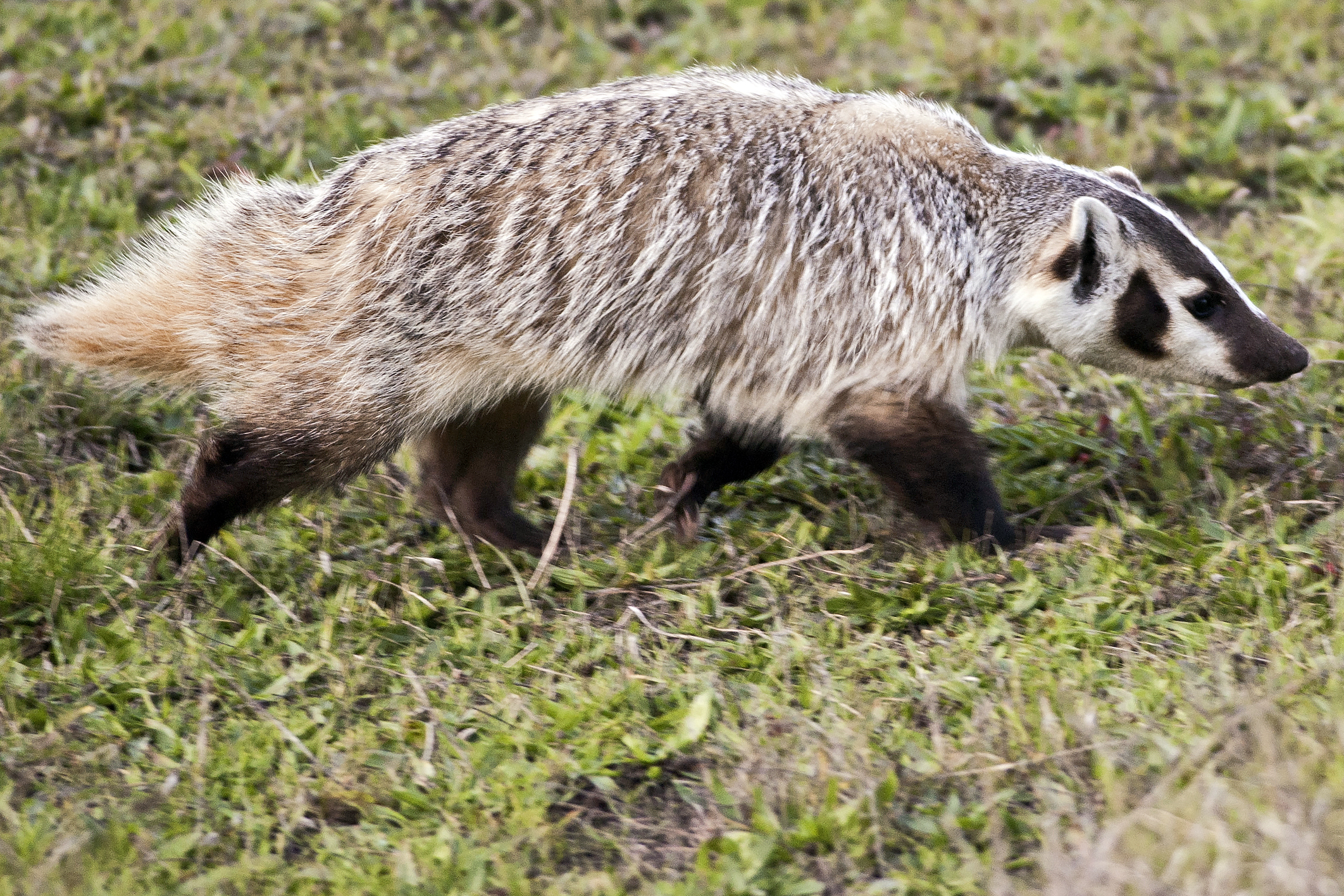
American badger

Family: Canidae

- Coyote, Canis latrans
- Gray wolf, Canis lupus
- Gray fox, Urocyon cinereoargenteus
- Red fox, Vulpes vulpes

Family: Ursidae

- American black bear, Ursus americanus
- Brown bear, Ursus arctos
  - Grizzly bear, U. a. horribilis

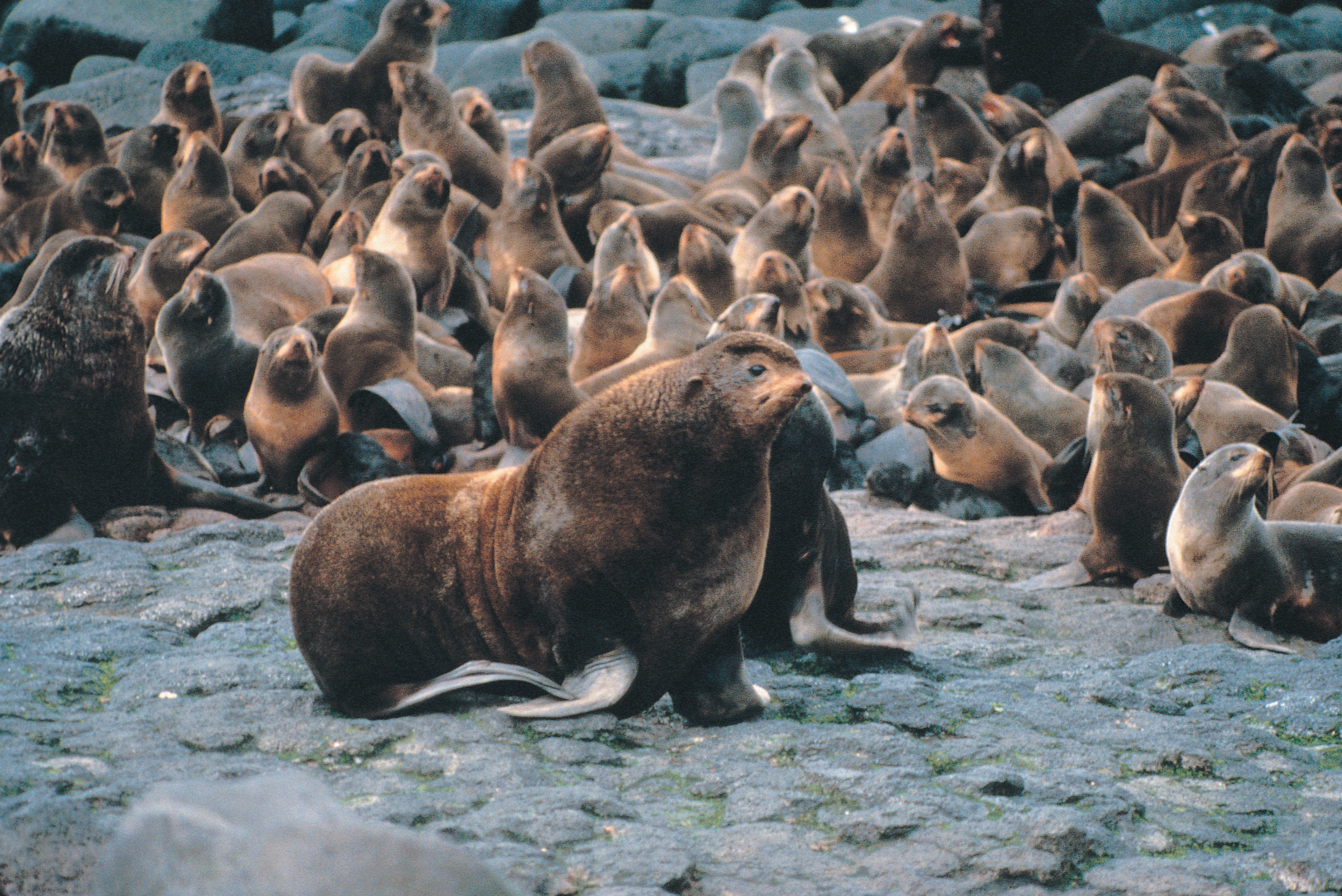
Northern fur seal

Steller sea lion

California sea lion

Family: Otariidae

- Northern fur seal, Callorhinus ursinus
- Steller sea lion, Eumetopias jubatus
- California sea lion, Zalophus californianus

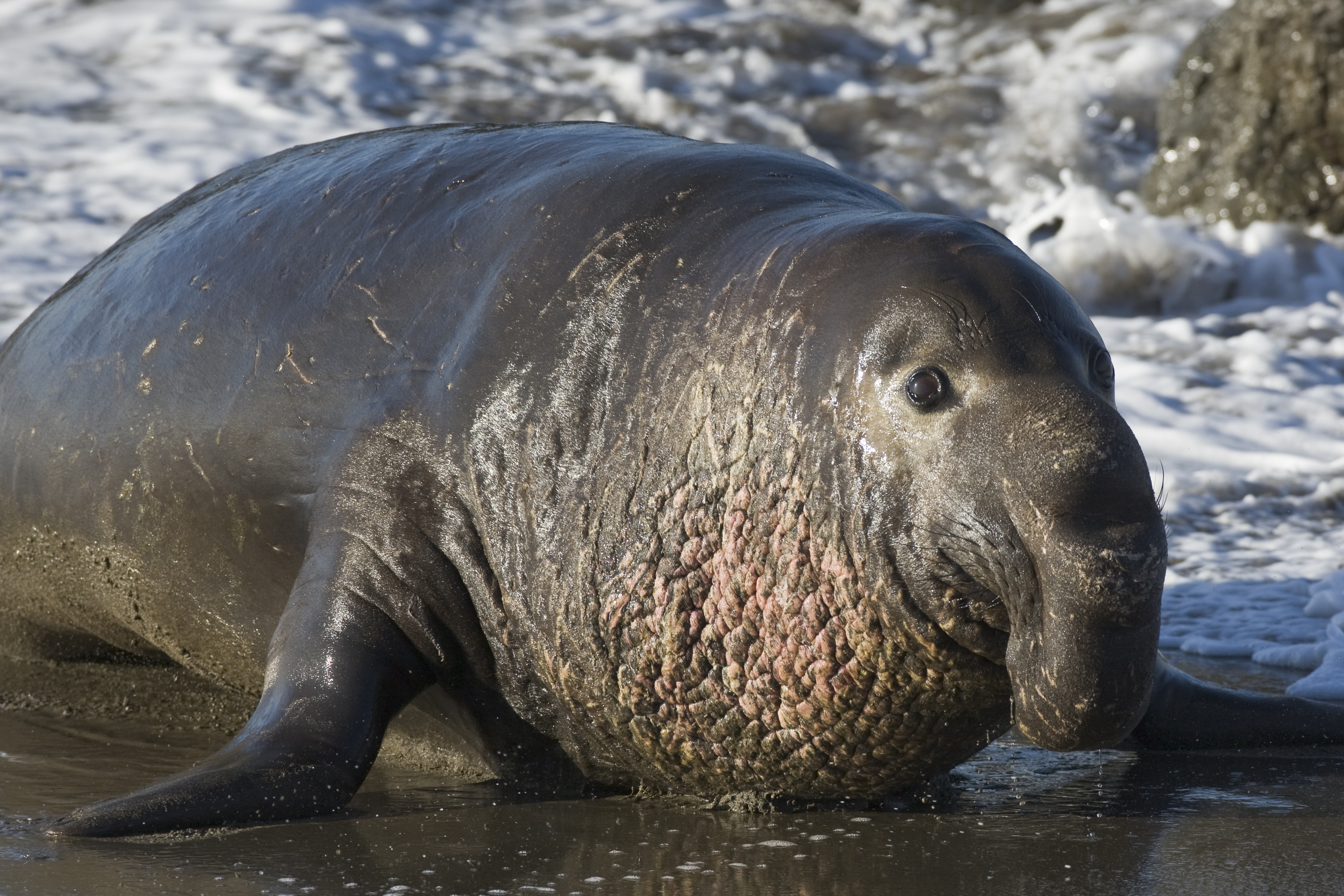
Northern elephant seal

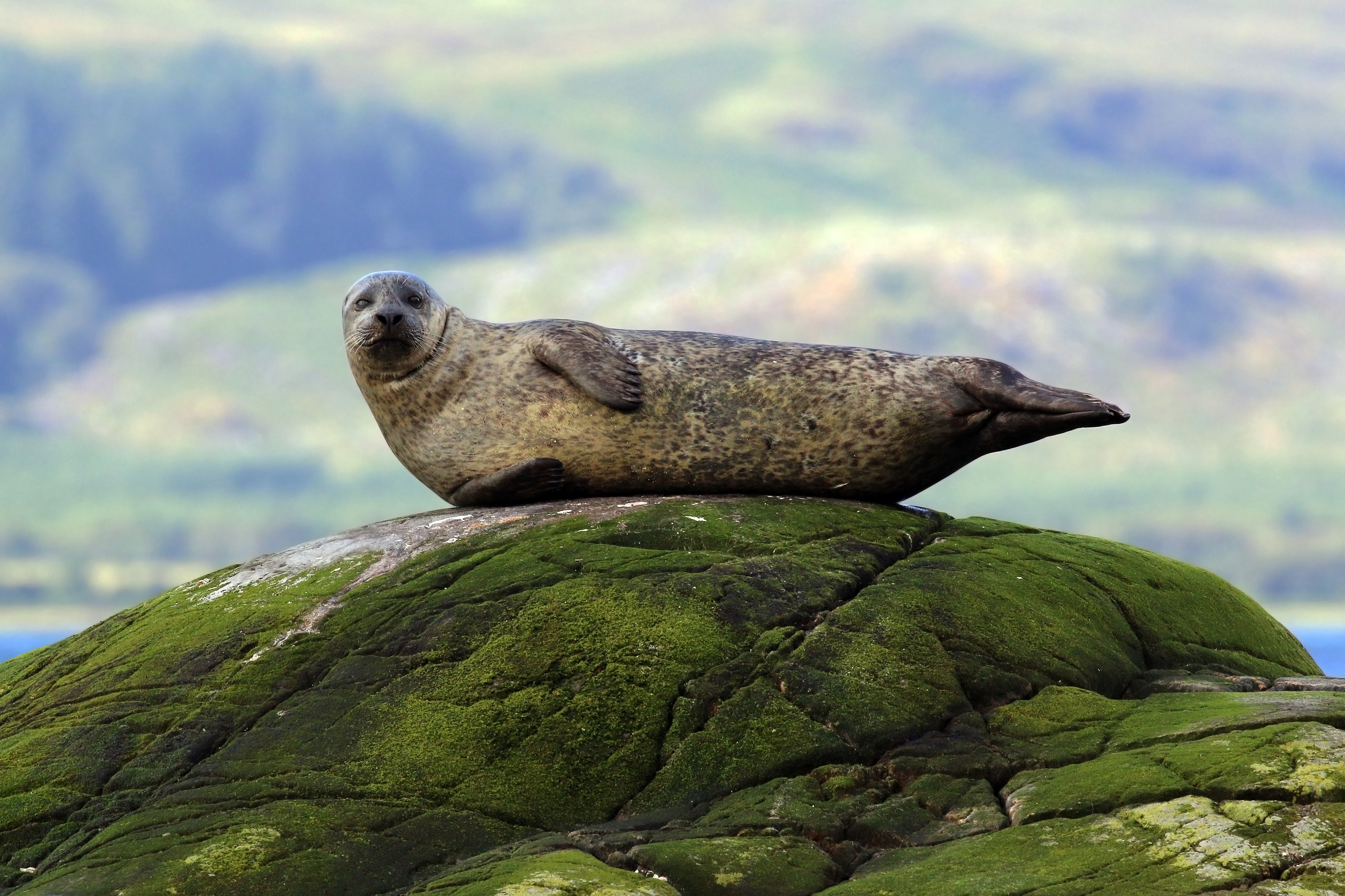
Harbor seal

Family: Phocidae

- Northern elephant seal, Mirounga angustirostris
- Harbor seal, Phoca vitulina

Family: Procyonidae

- Raccoon, Procyon lotor

Family: Mephitidae

- Striped skunk, Mephitis mephitis
- Western spotted skunk, Spilogale gracilis

Family: Felidae

- Canada lynx, Lynx canadensis
- Bobcat, Lynx rufus
- Cougar, Puma concolor

Family: Mustelidae

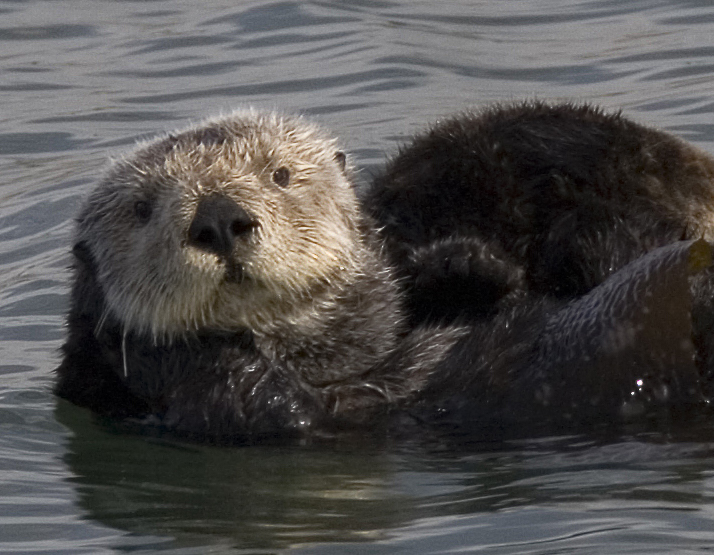
Sea otter

- Sea otter, Enhydra lutris
- North American river otter, Lontra canadensis
- Long-tailed weasel, Neogale frenata
- American mink, Neogale vison
- Fisher, Pekania pennanti
- American ermine, Mustela richardsonii
- Wolverine, Gulo gulo
- Pacific marten, Martes caurina
- American badger, Taxidea taxus

== Whales, dolphins and porpoises ==
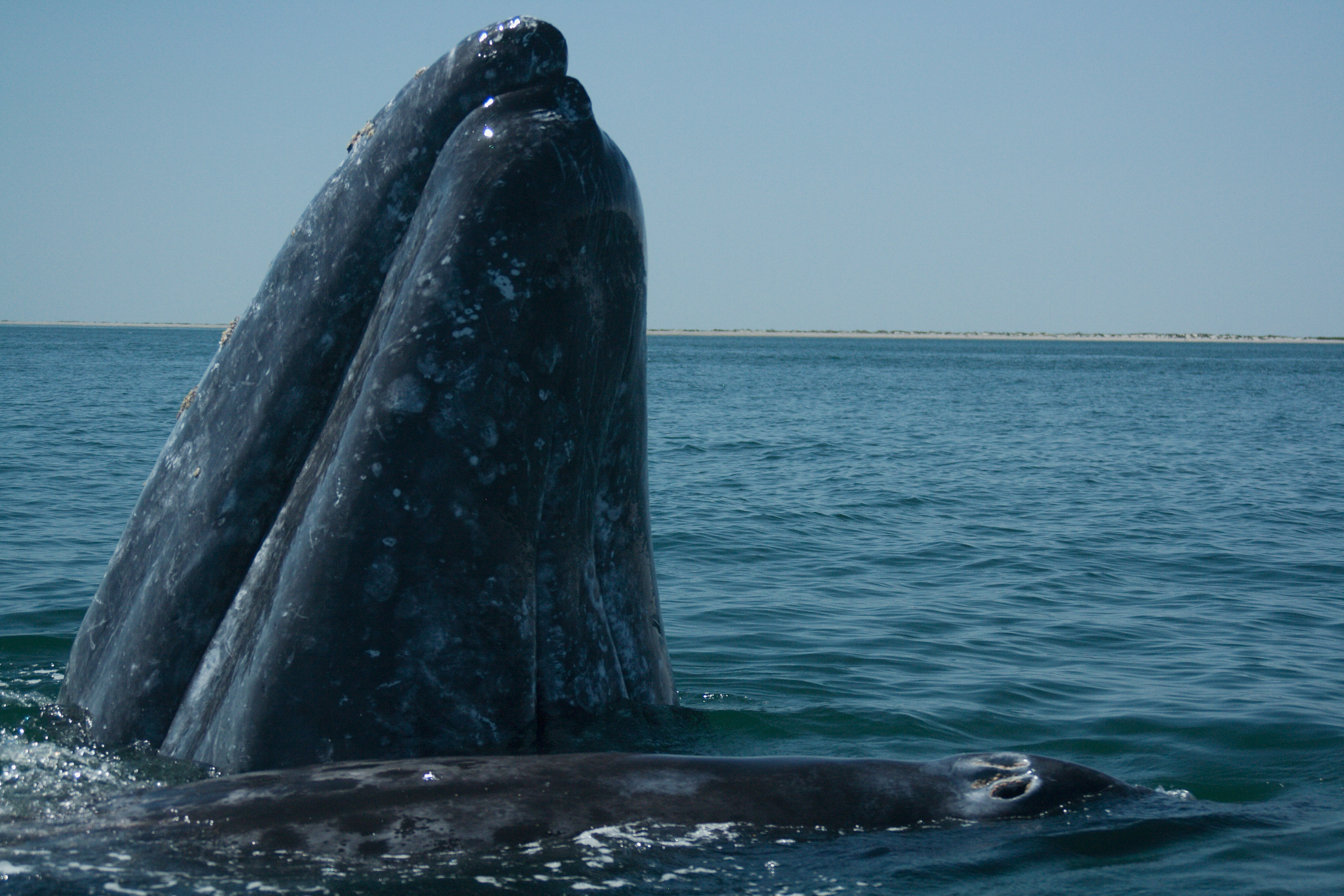
Gray whale

Family: Balaenidae

- North Pacific right whale, Eubalaena japonica

Family: Balaenopteridae

- Minke whale, Balaenoptera acutorostrata
- Sei whale, Balaenoptera borealis
- Blue whale, Balaenoptera musculus
- Fin whale, Balaenoptera physalus
- Humpback whale, Megaptera novaengliae
- Gray whale, Eschrictius robustus

Family: Delphinidae

- Common dolphin, Delphinus delphis
- Risso's dolphin, Grampus griseus
- Pacific white-sided dolphin, Lagenorynchus obliquidens
- Northern right whale dolphin, Lissodelphis borealis
- Orca, Orcinus orca

Family: Monodontidae

- Beluga whale, Delphinapterus leucas vagrant

Family: Phocoenidae

- Harbor porpoise, Phocoena phocoena
- Dall's porpoise, Phocoenoides dalli

Family: Physeteridae

- Pygmy sperm whale, Kogia breviceps
- Dwarf sperm whale, Kogia sima
- Sperm whale, Physeter macrocephalus

Family: Ziphiidae

- Baird's beaked whale, Berardius bairdii
- Hubbs' beaked whale, Mesoplodon carlhubbsi
- Stejneger's beaked whale, Mesoplodon stejnegeri
- Cuvier's beaked whale, Ziphius cavirostris

== Even-toed ungulates ==
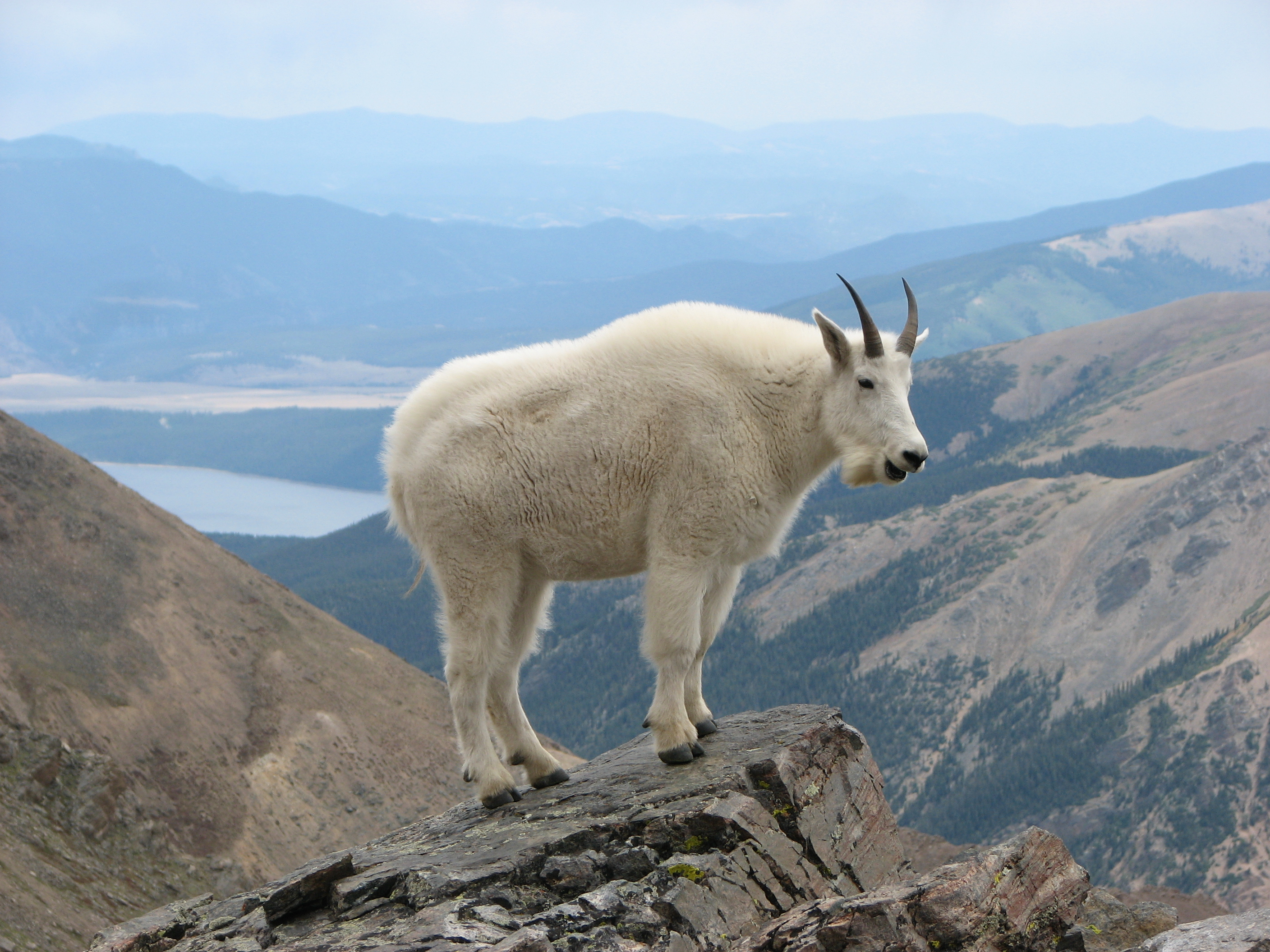
Mountain goat

Family: Antilocapridae

- Pronghorn, Antilocapra americana reintroduced

Family: Bovidae

- American bison, Bison bison reintroduced
- Mountain goat, Oreamnos americanus
- Bighorn sheep, Ovis canadensis

Family: Cervidae

- Moose, Alces alces
- Elk, Cervus canadensis
- Mule deer, Odocoileus hemionus
- White-tailed deer, Odocoileus virginianius
- Caribou, Rangifer tarandus extirpated
  - Boreal woodland caribou, R. t. caribou extirpated
