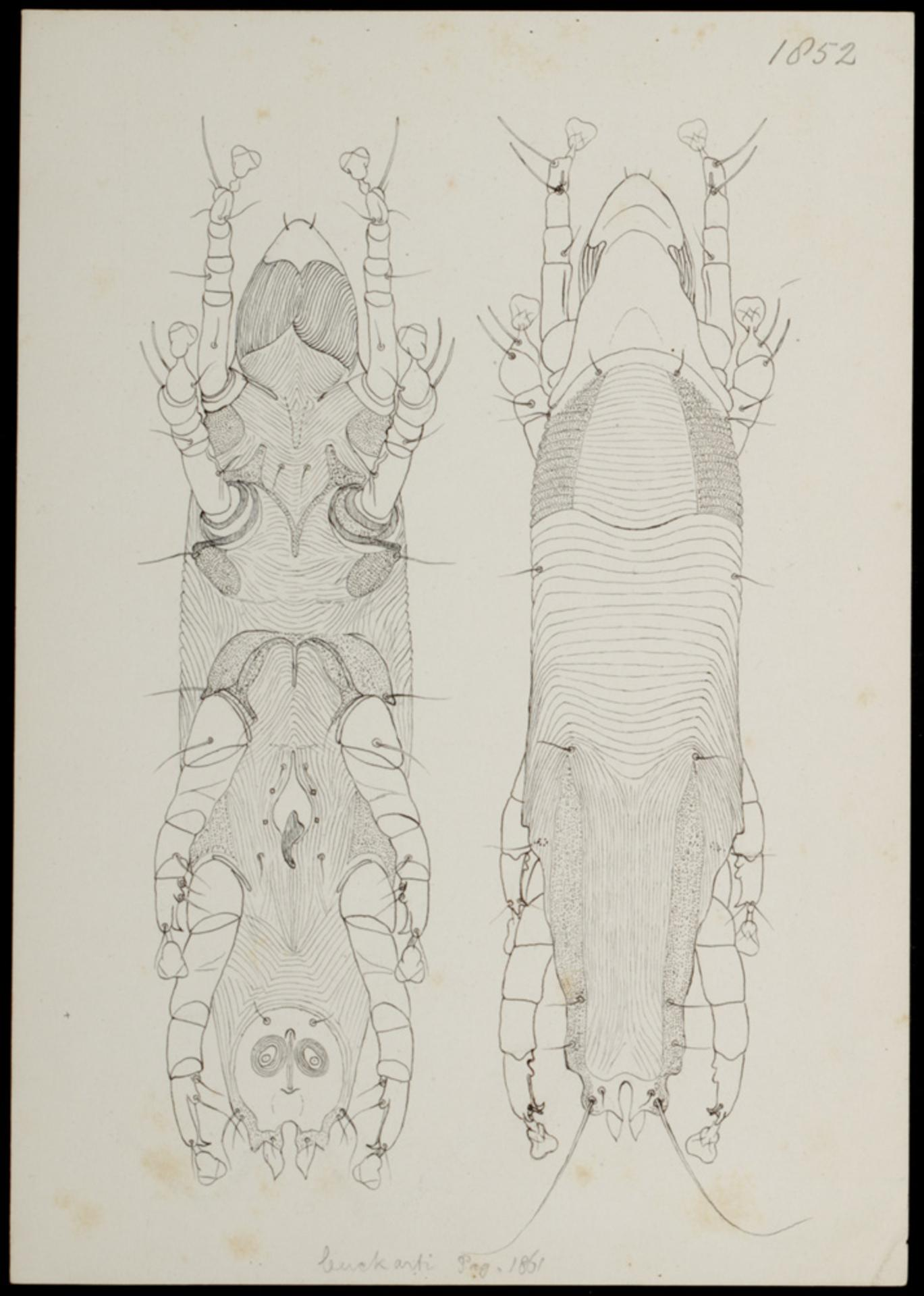
- Listrophorus leuckarti

Scientific classification
- Domain: Eukaryota
- Kingdom: Animalia
- Phylum: Arthropoda
- Subphylum: Chelicerata
- Class: Arachnida
- Order: Sarcoptiformes
- Family: Listrophoridae
- Genus: Listrophorus; Pagenstecher, 1861

Species
- Listrophorus arishi Oyoun, El-Kammah & El-Kady, 1994; Listrophorus caudatus Fain, Smith & Whitaker, 1986; Listrophorus laynei Fain, Smith & Whitaker, 1986; Listrophorus leuckarti Pagenstecher, 1861; Listrophorus mediterraneus Portus, Fain & Lukoschus, 1980; Listrophorus mustelae Mégnin, 1885; Listrophorus occitanus Fain & Portus, 1978

= Listrophorus =

Genus of mites

Listrophorus is a genus of parasitic mites in the family Listrophoridae. North American species with their hosts include:

- Listrophorus americanus – muskrat (Ondatra zibethicus)
- Listrophorus caudatus – round-tailed muskrat (Neofiber alleni)
- Listrophorus dicrostonyx – collared lemming (Dicrostonyx)
- Listrophorus dozieri – muskrat; Virginia opossum (Didelphis virginiana)
- Listrophorus faini – muskrat
- Listrophorus floridanus – southeastern pocket gopher (Geomys pinetis)
- Listrophorus kingstownensis – muskrat
- Listrophorus klebergi – hispid pocket mouse (Chaetodipus hispidus); hispid cotton rat (Sigmodon hispidus)
- Listrophorus laynei – round-tailed muskrat
- Listrophorus leuckarti – meadow vole (Microtus pennsylvanicus); house mouse (Mus musculus)
- Listrophorus mexicanus – sagebrush vole (Lemmiscus curtatus); rock vole (Microtus chrotorrhinus); montane vole (Microtus montanus); prairie vole (Microtus ochrogaster); creeping vole (Microtus oregoni); meadow vole; water vole (Microtus richardsoni); Townsend's vole (Microtus townsendii); western red-backed vole (Myodes californicus); southern red-backed vole (Myodes gapperi); southern bog lemming (Synaptomys cooperi); white-footed mouse (Peromyscus leucopus); house mouse; woodland jumping mouse (Napaeozapus insignis); meadow jumping mouse (Zapus hudsonius); western jumping mouse (Zapus princeps); least weasel (Mustela nivalis); pallid bat (Antrozous pallidus); Townsend's mole (Scapanus townsendii); marsh shrew (Sorex bendirii); long-tailed shrew (Sorex dispar)
- Listrophorus neotomae – Florida woodrat (Neotoma floridana); southern Plains woodrat (Neotoma micropus)
- Listrophorus ondatrae – muskrat
- Listrophorus phenacomys – eastern heather vole (Phenacomys ungava)
- Listrophorus pitymys – northern short-tailed shrew (Blarina brevicauda); meadow vole; pine vole (Microtus pinetorum)
- Listrophorus sparsilineatus – cotton mouse (Peromyscus gossypinus)
- Listrophorus synaptomys – northern bog lemming (Synaptomys borealis); southern bog lemming
- Listrophorus validus – muskrat

An unidentified species has been recorded on the marsh rice rat (Oryzomys palustris) in Georgia.

== See also ==
- List of parasites of the marsh rice rat

== Literature cited ==
- Morlan, Harvey B. (1952). "Host Relationships and Seasonal Abundance of Some Southwest Georgia Southwest Georgia Ectoparasites". The American Midland Naturalist. 48 (1): 74–93. doi:10.2307/2422133. JSTOR 2422133.
- Whitaker, John O.; Wilson, Nixon (1974). "Host and Distribution Lists of Mites (Acari), Parasitic and Phoretic, in the Hair of Wild Mammals of North America, North of Mexico". The American Midland Naturalist. 91 (1): 1–67. doi:10.2307/2424511. JSTOR 2424511.
- Whitaker, John; Walters, Brianne; Castor, Linda; Ritzi, Christopher; Wilson, Nixon (24 July 2007). "HOST AND DISTRIBUTION LISTS OF MITES (ACARI), PARASITIC AND PHORETIC, IN THE HAIR OR ON THE SKIN OF NORTH AMERICAN WILD MAMMALS NORTH OF MEXICO: RECORDS SINCE 1974". Harold W. Manter Laboratory of Parasitology: Faculty and Staff Publications.
