= Gray-tailed vole =

Conservation status
- Least Concern (IUCN 3.1)

Scientific classification
- Kingdom: Animalia
- Phylum: Chordata
- Class: Mammalia
- Order: Rodentia
- Family: Cricetidae
- Subfamily: Arvicolinae
- Genus: Microtus
- Subgenus: Mynomes
- Species: M. canicaudus

Binomial name
- Microtus canicaudus Miller, 1897
- Distribution of the gray-tailed vole

Species of rodent

The gray-tailed vole (Microtus canicaudus) also known as the gray-tailed meadow vole or gray-tailed meadow mouse, is a rodent in the genus Microtus (small-eared "meadow voles") of the family Cricetidae. Voles are small mammals, and this species lies roughly in the middle of their size range. First collected in 1895, it is endemic to the Willamette Valley, Oregon, and Clark County, Washington, in the Pacific Northwest region of North America. Historically, they were found in the prairie areas of the Valley and, though many of these areas have been converted for agricultural purposes, these animals remain common. For reasons that remain unclear, vole population densities in any area may fluctuate widely from season to season and year to year. They are preyed upon by owls, hawks, and carnivorous mammals, and their parasites include fleas and ticks. These voles build burrows and complex tunnel networks, which they sometimes share with other burrowing animals. Relatively little is known about their behavior in the wild, because they are elusive and unlikely to enter traps.

== Taxonomy ==
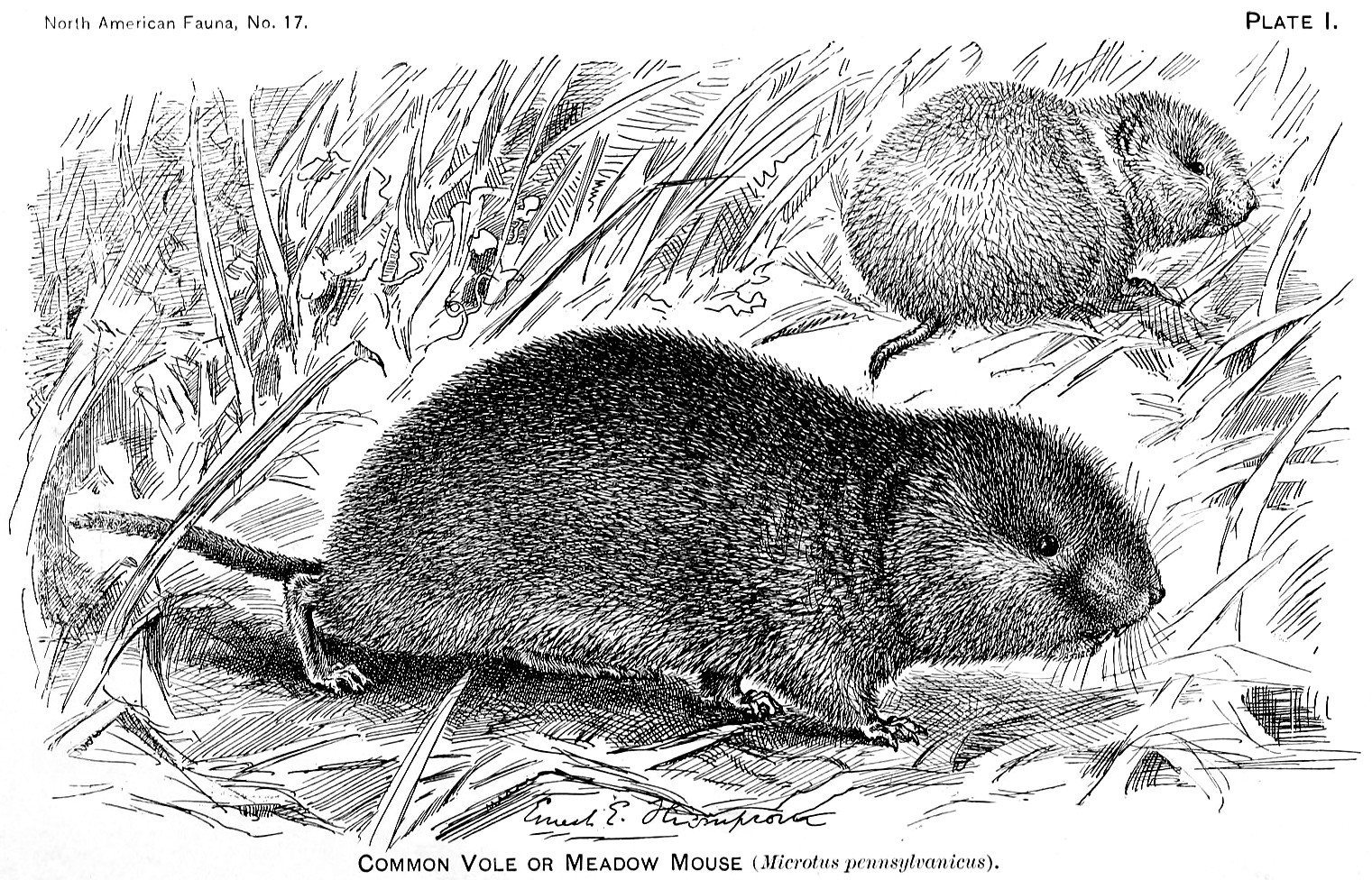
Illustration of a related Microtus species

The scientific name of the gray-tailed vole is Microtus canicaudus. The generic name Microtus derives from the Ancient Greek words μικρός (small) and οὖς (ear). The species name canicaudus derives from the Latin canens (gray) and cauda (tail). The gray-tailed vole was first described in 1897 by Gerrit S. Miller in the Proceedings of the Biological Society of Washington. The type specimen was collected in McCoy, Oregon, on December 1, 1895, by B.J. Bretherton. Miller's initial examination included the type specimen and eleven others. Two from his collection had been obtained in Beaverton. The remaining specimens, collected in McCoy, were part of the US National Museum Biological Survey under C. Hart Merriam.

The gray-tailed vole is monotypic, but there are some differences between specimens obtained on either side of the Columbia River. It appears to be a sibling species of the montane vole (Microtus montanus) or of Townsend's vole (M. townsendii). It was classified as a geographic race or subspecies of the montane vole by Hall and Kelson in 1951, but laboratory analyses, including electrophoresis and karyotype evaluations, subsequently confirmed that they are two separate species. The karyotypes of the montane vole and the gray-tailed vole are dissimilar in terms of homology in 6 of 22 autosomal arms. The quantity and distribution of heterochromatin among both X chromosomes and autosomes is different as well. The two species are allopatric, but not contiguously so.

== Description ==
The gray-tailed vole is a small mammal in the middle of the size range for voles in general. The fur on the back is yellowish-brown or yellowish-gray. They have a short tail, black or brown above and grayish below. The young have gray fur on the underside and a darker, "sooty" gray on the back. The feet of the young are dusky, and they have a gray tail with a black stripe. They are similar in size and overall appearance to the montane vole, but with a more yellowish fur and a grayer tail. The type specimen measured 135 mm (5.3 in) in total length. The tail vertebrae measured 33 mm (1.3 in) and the hind foot measured 20 mm (0.79 in). Typical adults average 141 mm (5.6 in) in total length, with a 35 mm (1.4 in) tail. The feet measure 20 mm (0.79 in) and the ears 12 mm (0.47 in). On each side they have an upper and lower incisor and three upper and lower molars, for a total of 16 teeth.

Gray-tailed voles are sympatric with Townsend's vole (M. townsendii), with which they share many similarities. They can be distinguished by appearance, because Townsend's vole has darker colorings, a longer tail, and differences in the structure of the hard palate. Gray-tailed and montane voles also differ in some aspects of hard palate structure, especially the incisive foramina. The gray-tailed vole shares its geographic range with the creeping vole (Microtus oregoni) as well. The gray-tailed vole has a sturdier build, larger eyes, and some differences in the upper molars.

== Distribution and habitat ==
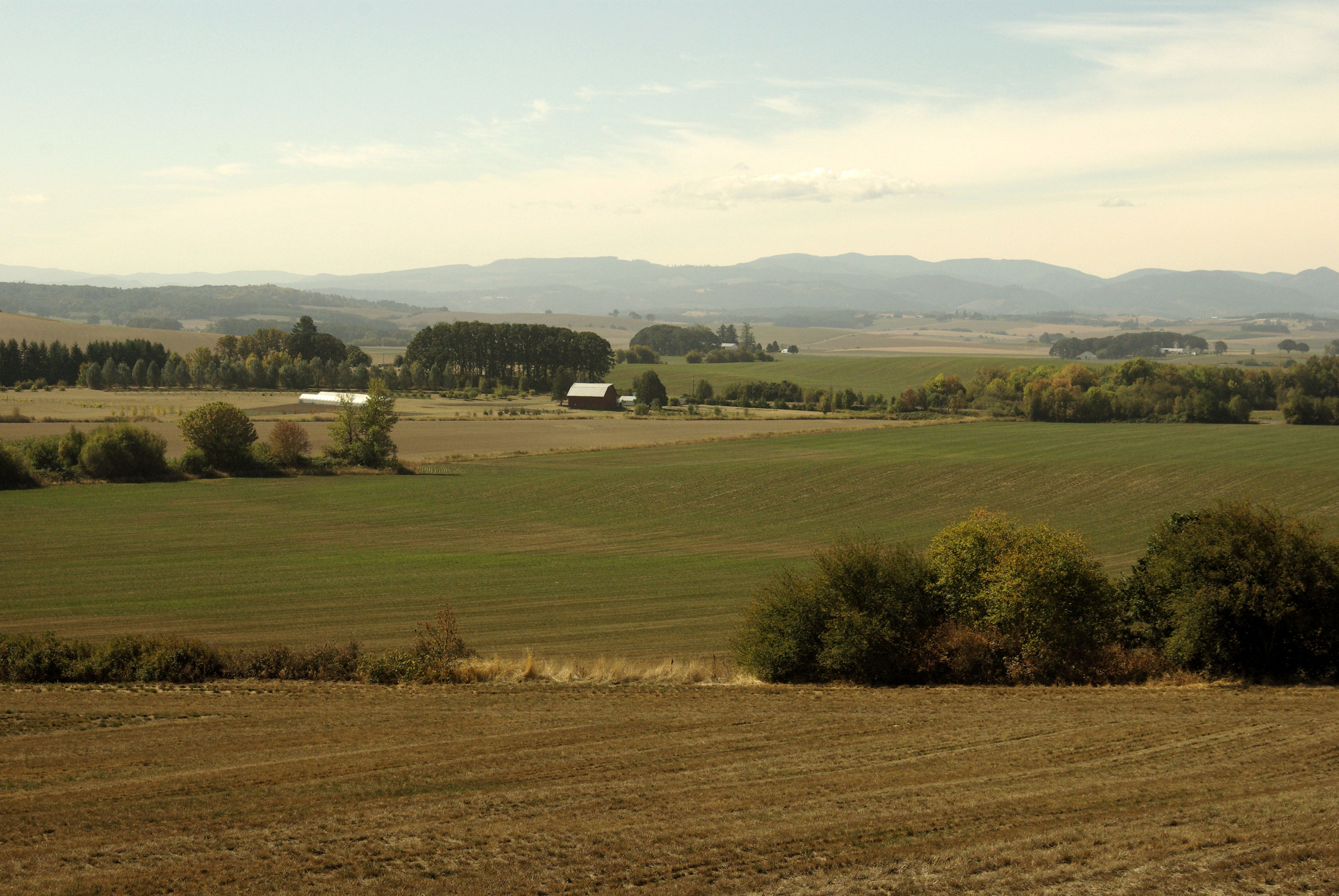
Prairie in the Willamette Valley, converted for agricultural use

The gray-tailed vole is endemic to the Willamette Valley, Oregon, and to Clark County, Washington. Its range in Oregon extends from Scappoose and Gresham in the north, through the Willamette Valley to around Eugene. Reports of the species east of the Cascades have been called into question. Gray-tailed voles are prevalent in agricultural areas: they are found in and around pastures, hayfields, grain fields, and disturbed habitats. They once inhabited grassy prairies of the valley. These prairies were burned annually by Native Americans, with uncertain effects on vole populations.

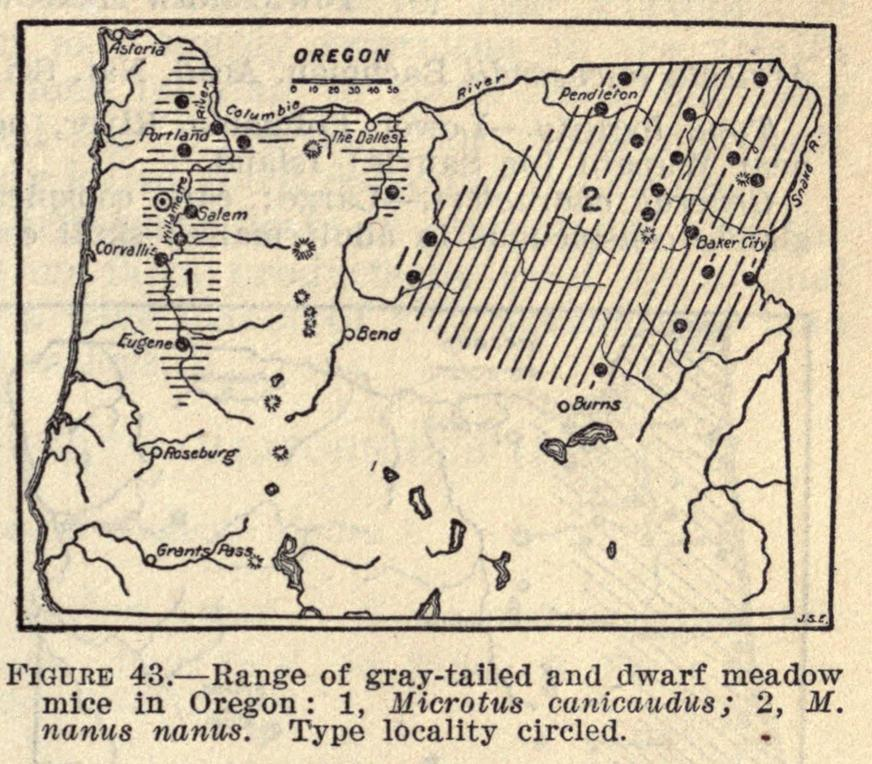
Range of gray-tailed vole and dwarf meadow mice in Oregon

Vernon Orlando Bailey describes the Willamette Valley as part of the humid division of the Transition Zone. Annual precipitation there is 40 in (100 cm), falling mostly in the winter. The valley is warmer and drier than the surrounding hills, less heavily forested, and better suited to agricultural use. In 1901, zoologist Edmund Heller visited McCoy, where the type specimen of the gray-tailed vole had been collected. The account of his journey is relayed by Daniel Giraud Elliot, referring specifically to the terrain inhabited by the gray-tailed vole.

Heller described the area around McCoy as "much the same kind of country as Beaverton, but more level and forested. The coast range is about fifteen miles distant. In some places, forests of Douglas fir occur, but the land is chiefly open and grassy. White oaks and a few yellow pine occur also, and the region I should judge was more Transition than that at Beaverton." He described Beaverton as: "low and rolling, but hills are entirely lacking in the immediate vicinity of the town. The timbered land is covered with forests of yellow pine (Pinus jeffreyi), Douglas fir (Pseudotsuga taxifolia), white oak (Quercus zarryana), etc. The soil is chiefly black adobe except on the higher parts, where it is largely clay. The region evidently is Transition in character of its vegetation as shown by the presence of the yellow pine and white oak."

Mammals sharing the Transition Zone with the gray-tailed vole include: Roosevelt elk, Columbian black-tailed deer, Columbian white-tailed deer, Washington rabbit, brush rabbit, silver gray squirrel, Douglas's squirrel, Townsend's chipmunk, Douglas's ground squirrel, Oregon flying squirrel, dusky wood rat, ruddy deer mouse, California red-backed mouse, red tree vole, white-footed phenacomys, Townsend's vole, Oregon creeping mouse, mountain beaver (Aplodontia rufa), jumping mice including Zapus princeps and Zapus trinotatus, Camas pocket gopher, Mazama pocket gopher, and northwest coast bobcat (Lynx rufus fasciatus). Birds in the range include: sooty grouse, Oregon ruffed grouse, band-tailed pigeon, California pygmy owl, Harris's woodpecker, northern pileated woodpecker, Lewis's woodpecker, Vaux's swift, Steller's jay, Townsend's warbler, western winter wren, California creeper, Oregon chickadee, chestnut-backed chickadee, wrentit, western golden-crowned kinglet, and black-headed grosbeak.

== Behavior ==
Gray-tailed voles are burrowing rodents that construct complex networks of tunnels and burrows. They may also nest above ground, sheltered under wood, abandoned equipment, or other agricultural debris. They are known to use the tunnel networks of the Camas pocket gopher. The tunnels are built to provide shelter during wet periods, which are frequent throughout their range. When the tunnels flood, the voles swim to dry areas or chambers in which air has been trapped. If the networks flood completely, they will head for higher ground. As many as 20–30 voles have been seen gathered on dry fence posts in flooded areas. When approached, they swam to safer ground nearby. Where tunnels intersect, they sometimes establish middens 8–15 cm (3.1–5.9 in) long by 3–5 cm (1.2–2.0 in) wide by 8–10 cm (3.1–3.9 in) deep.

Gray-tailed voles are difficult to capture live in the wild, as they are unlikely to enter enclosure type traps. The most effective traps are laid inconspicuously along commonly used runways, so that the voles run directly into them. Much of what is known about the voles has been obtained from observing them in captivity.

== Ecology ==
Growth and development of gray-tailed voles
| | Male | | Female | |
| Age (weeks) | Weight | Length | Weight | Length |
|---|---|---|---|---|
| 1 | 6.0 g (0.21 oz) | 68.7 mm (2.70 in) | 5.5 g (0.19 oz) | 66 mm (2.6 in) |
| 2 | 11 g (0.39 oz) | 97.5 mm (3.84 in) | 10.3 g (0.36 oz) | 92.2 mm (3.63 in) |
| 3 | 16.5 g (0.58 oz) | 117 mm (4.6 in) | 15.2 g (0.54 oz) | 114.8 mm (4.52 in) |
| 4 | 21.0 g (0.74 oz) | 129.5 mm (5.10 in) | 19.3 g (0.68 oz) | 24 mm (0.94 in) |
| 5 | 24.6 g (0.87 oz) | 136.9 mm (5.39 in) | 21.3 g (0.75 oz) | 129 mm (5.1 in) |
| 6 | 26.1 g (0.92 oz) | 140.9 mm (5.55 in) | 22.2 g (0.78 oz) | 131.1 mm (5.16 in) |
| 7 | 27.6 g (0.97 oz) | 144.8 mm (5.70 in) | 22.1 g (0.78 oz) | 132.6 mm (5.22 in) |
| 8 | 28.8 g (1.02 oz) | 146.9 mm (5.78 in) | 22.8 g (0.80 oz) | 134.3 mm (5.29 in) |

Information about the reproductive habits of gray-tailed voles is based on studies of captive animals. In captivity, female voles as young as 18 days, weighing only 12.5 g (0.44 oz) are capable of reproducing. Litters produced by these younger females result in larger litters, newborns of smaller mass, and lower rates of newborn survival. The gestation period is 21–23 days. The newborns weigh around 2.5 g (0.088 oz). The average litter size is around 4.5. It is uncertain how frequently gray-tailed voles breed. Breeding likely occurs year-round.

Gray-tailed voles recognize relatives based on familiarity. Under laboratory conditions, gray-tailed voles familiar with one another produced fewer litters than unfamiliar ones. Pairings of related voles resulted in lower pup survival than did pairings of unrelated individuals. Common foods of the gray-tailed vole in the wild are thought to be grasses, clover, wild onion, and false dandelion. Published claims that the voles are omnivorous lack references or evidence.

Although gray-tailed voles are now described as common, Bailey reported them to be so scarce that few specimens were available. He also claimed that they were present east of the Cascades, but subsequent authorities have refuted this. Their population density fluctuates widely during the year. There is not much data available to calculate population density in the field, but studies in more controlled settings yield estimates of around 600 animals per 1 hectare (2.5 acres).

== Human interactions ==
Gray-tailed voles have been used in laboratory research projects. They have been used to study the effects of mineral deficiencies, such as selenium, which is lacking in Willamette Valley soils. They have also been used in studies on livestock feed modifications, including pretreatment of feeds by fermentation, sprouting the grains in the feeds, and clearance of radioactive isotopes from contaminated food.

Gray-tailed voles can become so abundant within their range that humans may take measures to control populations. Trapping them is challenging.

== Conservation status ==
The gray-tailed vole is listed as "least concern" by the IUCN (International Union for Conservation of Nature). No major threats to this common species are recognized. While its range is limited (less than 20,000 km^{2}), it thrives in agricultural environments, so land conversion for such purposes is not problematic. This species is listed as secure by NatureServe.
