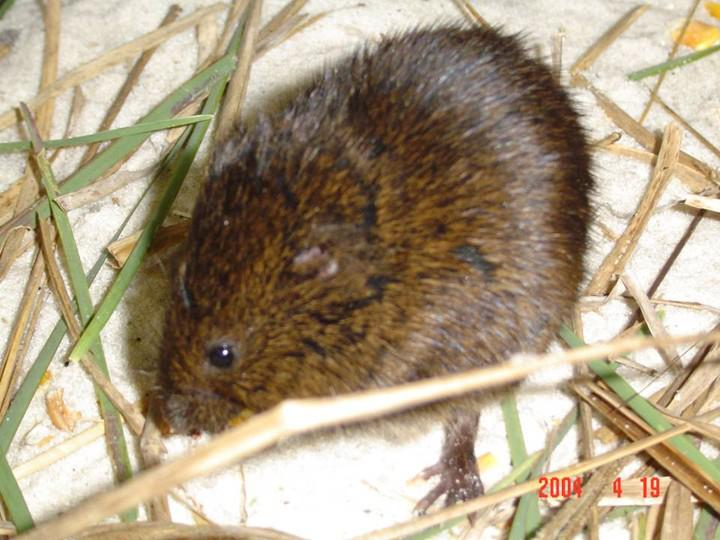

Conservation status
- Critically Imperiled (NatureServe)

- Endangered (ESA)

Scientific classification
- Kingdom: Animalia
- Phylum: Chordata
- Class: Mammalia
- Order: Rodentia
- Family: Cricetidae
- Subfamily: Arvicolinae
- Genus: Microtus
- Subgenus: Mynomes
- Species: M. dukecampbelli

Binomial name
- Microtus dukecampbelli C. A. Woods, Post, & Kilpatrick, 1982

Synonyms
- Microtus pennsylvanicus dukecampbelli

= Florida salt marsh vole =

Species of rodent

The Florida salt marsh vole (Microtus dukecampbelli) is a North American vole endemic to the state of Florida in the United States.

== Taxonomy ==
It was formerly thought conspecific with the eastern meadow vole (M. pennsylvanicus), but more recent genetic studies indicate that it is basal to both the eastern and western (M. drummondii) meadow voles, and thus represents a distinct species.

== Distribution ==
According to fossil and subfossil material, the Florida salt marsh vole formerly had a wide range throughout the southeastern United States, but by 5,000 years before the present, due to climatic changes prompting a transition from grassland to forest habitats, it became an uncommon species restricted to Florida. It is now restricted to just a single salt marsh in Waccasassa Bay in Levy County.

== Habitat ==
It is found in a transitional high salt marsh, near the edges of patches of Juncus roemerianus in patches of Distichlis spicata. It appears to avoid areas dominated by Spartina alterniflora.

== Threats ==
It is one of the most threatened, restricted, and poorly known mammals in North America. Due to its extremely small range, the species is at major risk of extinction from the effects of climate change, including severe tropical storms and hurricanes, and potentially sea level rise. Similar relict populations of the prairie vole (M. ochrogaster) on the Gulf Coast of Texas and Louisiana, which were reportedly abundant in the early 20th century, have since been extirpated, and the Florida salt marsh vole could potentially follow the same fate. Relatively few individuals have been sighted since 1979, with a 1992 survey with 1025 traps only catching a single individual. The population density is likely lower than 70 individuals per hectare. The species is thus of heavy conservation concern. It is considered Endangered by the U.S. Fish and Wildlife Service and Critically Imperiled by NatureServe.

The only known site for the species is on private land, although any activities in the area are restricted by the U.S. Army Corps of Engineers. The species could potentially occur on public land at the nearby Waccasassa Bay Preserve State Park.
