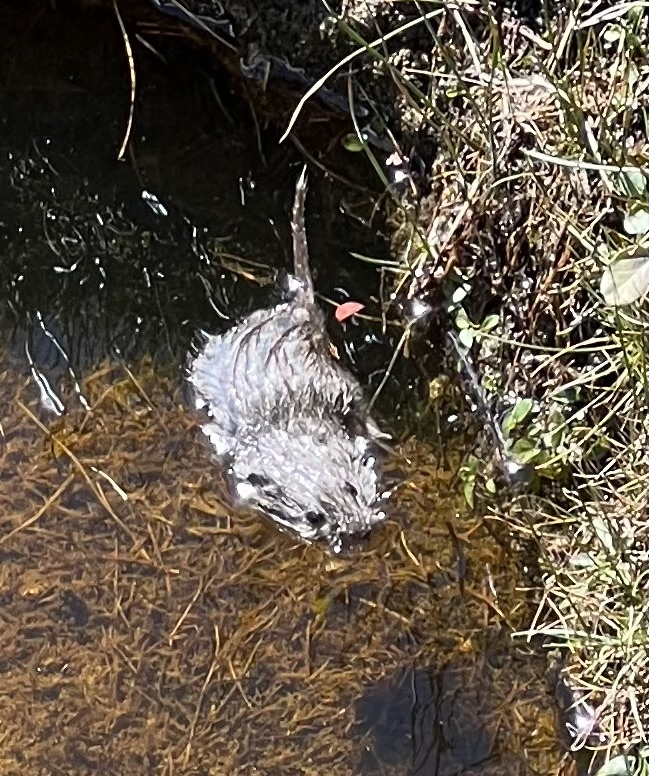

Conservation status
- Least Concern (IUCN 3.1)

Scientific classification
- Kingdom: Animalia
- Phylum: Chordata
- Class: Mammalia
- Infraclass: Placentalia
- Order: Rodentia
- Family: Cricetidae
- Subfamily: Arvicolinae
- Genus: Microtus
- Subgenus: Mynomes
- Species: M. richardsoni

Binomial name
- Microtus richardsoni (De Kay, 1842)

= North American water vole =

Species of rodent

The North American water vole or just water vole (Microtus richardsoni) is the largest North American vole. It is found in the northwestern United States and southern parts of western Canada. This animal has been historically considered a member of genus Arvicola, but molecular evidence demonstrates that it is more closely related to North American Microtus species. Water voles are on the USDA Forest Service Region 2 sensitive species list because they maintain very small populations and there is high concern that their required habitat may be declining.

These animals have gray-brown or red-brown fur with gray under parts. Their large hind feet help make them excellent swimmers, and they are found in alpine or semi-alpine meadows near water. They feed on grasses, leaves, roots and seeds, also eating small invertebrates. Water voles dig burrows that are connected to water sources, and are considered a semi-aquatic species.

They are active year-round, tunneling through snow during the winter. Their burrows often have entrances at the water's edge or under water, and they usually live in colonies of 8-40 individuals along the waterway.

== Etymology ==
The word vole originated in approximately 1805, and is short for vole-mouse, which means field mouse. Vole originated from the Norwegian word vollmus; voll, meaning field, and mus, meaning mouse. It is also possible that there were influences from Swedish vall, which translates to mean field.

Microtus richardsoni is also known as Richardson's water vole, Richardson vole, Richardson's meadow vole, Richardson meadow mouse, water rat, big-footed mouse, giant water vole, and water vole. The specific name is after Scottish naturalist Sir John Richardson.

== Taxonomy and evolution ==
Although this animal has been historically considered a member of genus Arvicola, molecular evidence demonstrates that it is more closely related to North American Microtus species. Genetic tests have been done that suggest that the closest relative to Microtus richardsoni is Microtus pennsylvanicus (the meadow vole). Paleontological evidence suggests that M. richardsoni diverged from a Mimomys ancestral form in Siberia approximately 1.5 million years before Arvicola evolved in Europe. This could indicate that it is the primitive form of the genus Microtus, and that the morphological similarities between M. richardsoni and Arvicola are likely convergent traits. Approximately 60 species are now considered to be in the genus Microtus.

== Appearance and anatomy ==
Water voles have unusually large hind feet, ranging between 25 and 34 mm (0.98 and 1.34 in) in length, which can help distinguish the water vole from other similar rodents, and contribute to its speed in the water. Males tend to be larger than females. On average these animals are about 20–27 cm (7.9–10.6 in) in total length (including the tail), with tails 6–10 cm (2.4–3.9 in) long, and weigh 125–178 grams (4.4–6.3 oz). The water vole is the second largest arvicoline in its range (after the muskrat). Their fur is grey-brown, dark brown, or reddish-brown on the upperparts, and is grayish-white on their underside. The water vole's large incisors, combined with its very large skull and well developed zygomatic arch (which strong chewing muscles attach to), contribute to its ability to efficiently dig tunnels and chew through tough roots.

== Behavior and ecology ==
=== Habitat and feeding ===
Water voles live in two distinct bands through the western United States and Canada, extending from British Columbia and Alberta through parts of Oregon, Washington, Montana, Idaho, Wyoming, and Utah. They are found in alpine or semi-alpine meadows near water, usually between 914–3,201 m (3,000–10,500 ft) in elevation. The distribution of habitats is found to be extremely variable, due to the geographical barriers of large coniferous forests, mountains, and expansive valleys without readily available waterways. Although, genetic data has been collected that suggests water voles do have the ability to disperse over land to reproduce with other populations, this overland dispersal between colonies tends to be higher with adjacent populations, and less so with increased distance. Because water voles live in such small isolated patches it is necessary for them to form such a metapopulation structure, in which dispersal can balance out local extinction.

Their main source of food is vegetation, including leaves, stems, grasses, sedges, willows, and sometimes seeds or insects. Their food source varies significantly depending on geographic location. Studies have shown that water voles have a very high metabolic rate, and therefore have to consume more food than other rodents their size. Most often, water voles feed on the subterranean portion of plants, which are available to them year round. There is no evidence that they store food for the winter. During the winter they are seen to dig tunnels through the snow, and usually do not surface above the snow once 6 cm (2.4 in) have accumulated (approx. 7 to 8 months of the year). Water voles are most active at night, and they travel between tunnels, nests and waterways by means of surface runways 5–7 cm (2.0–2.8 in) wide through the vegetation. Often tunnel or burrow entrances are found either at water level or submerged along the river banks. They construct these tunnels and nests just below the roots of the vegetation (about 4–6 cm (1.6–2.4 in) below ground) during the breeding season (June through late September). Females give birth and care for her young in these underground nests, lined with leaves and grass.

=== Social life and breeding habits ===
Water voles are usually found within 5 to 10 m (16 to 33 ft) of waterways. They form a polygynous social group, in which females tend to stay within their territory, which does not overlap other females, and males travel between burrows to reproduce with several females. Because of this system, males travel over a much larger home range than females, and they tend to be more aggressive than females, with aggressiveness coinciding with breeding patterns. Estrus is induced by contact with reproductively active males, and tends to first coincide with the appearance of vegetation in the spring. Both males and females have rather large flank glands, which serve to mark territories so that nests are not invaded by others, as well as signaling to mates during the breeding season. Water voles breed for 3 months during the summer, and young are born from June until late September. Females generally have litters of approx. 5-6 young, with a minimum gestation period of 22 days. Litter size tends to increase with age of the mother, and ranges from 2-10 young. Although water voles appear to have the ability to reproduce in large numbers, as do many other rodents, their population densities are actually kept very low and live in colonies of 8-40 individuals. This may be due to the very short breeding season compared to other rodents who breed for 6 months or more.

=== Birthing and parental care ===
Newborn voles are naked and blind, and weigh about 5 g. They are able to vocalize immediately, and within 3 days start to show fur. By day 10 they are running and climbing, and by day 17 they are swimming on their own. Mother feeds them by lactation until they are 21 days old, and they nest together for approximately 32 days, during which time the pups are growing about 1.24 grams per day. Evidence shows that although they may still be nesting with their mother, she provides very minimal parental care after weaning. Around the time they reach 40 days of age, they move to their own nests and about 3 weeks later reach sexual maturity. Approximately 26% of young males and females begin to reproduce during the breeding season of their birth, but overwintered adults are responsible for most of the reproduction. Some adult females may have up to two litters during one breeding season. Among overwintered adults, 90% of females and 100% of males are reproductively active.

== Life span ==
The age distribution studied among populations show a 1:1 replacement of adults by young. Most water voles only live through one winter, and die at the end of the second breeding season. Very few adults survive two winters.

== Loss of habitat and endangerment ==
There have been several studies done on the habitat of the vole, given its very specific requirements, to find out if grazing or precipitation levels affect the vole populations so that we can protect them. It has been found that higher precipitation levels create increased availability of usable habitat for water voles. In years of that are wetter than usual it has been observed that young water voles become reproductively active sooner, and therefore can have more offspring. The mean number of pups in each litter increased as well. It has also been found that grazing affects the water vole populations as well. In areas of light or moderate grazing not as many young survived, and the population sizes tended to be much smaller than other colonies. Where there was severe grazing it affected the stream bank to an extent that it was no longer a suitable habitat. The presence of livestock presents numerous detrimental changes to the water vole's habitat: altered abiotic characteristics, compacted soil, increased runoff, fractured stream banks, erosion, as well as loss of vegetation as protective cover and a food source. The abundance of ferns, mosses and shrubs are imperative as ground cover to protect water voles from predation, and in areas of grazing these plants were scarce or non-existent, and therefore water voles weren't often found in these areas.
