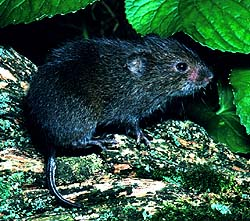
- Microtus drummondii

Scientific classification
- Kingdom: Animalia
- Phylum: Chordata
- Class: Mammalia
- Order: Rodentia
- Family: Cricetidae
- Subfamily: Arvicolinae
- Genus: Microtus
- Subgenus: Mynomes; Rafinesque, 1817

Species
- Microtus breweri Microtus canicaudus Microtus drummondii Microtus dukecampbelli Microtus montanus Microtus oregoni Microtus pennsylvanicus Microtus townsendii

= Microtus (Mynomes) =

Subgenus of rodents

Mynomes is a North American subgenus of voles in the genus Microtus. Species in this subgenus are:

- Gray-tailed vole, M. canicaudus
- Western meadow vole M. drummondii
- Florida salt marsh vole M. dukecampbelli
- Montane vole, M. montanus
- Creeping vole, M. oregoni
- Eastern meadow vole, M. pennsylvanicus
- Townsend's vole, M. townsendii
