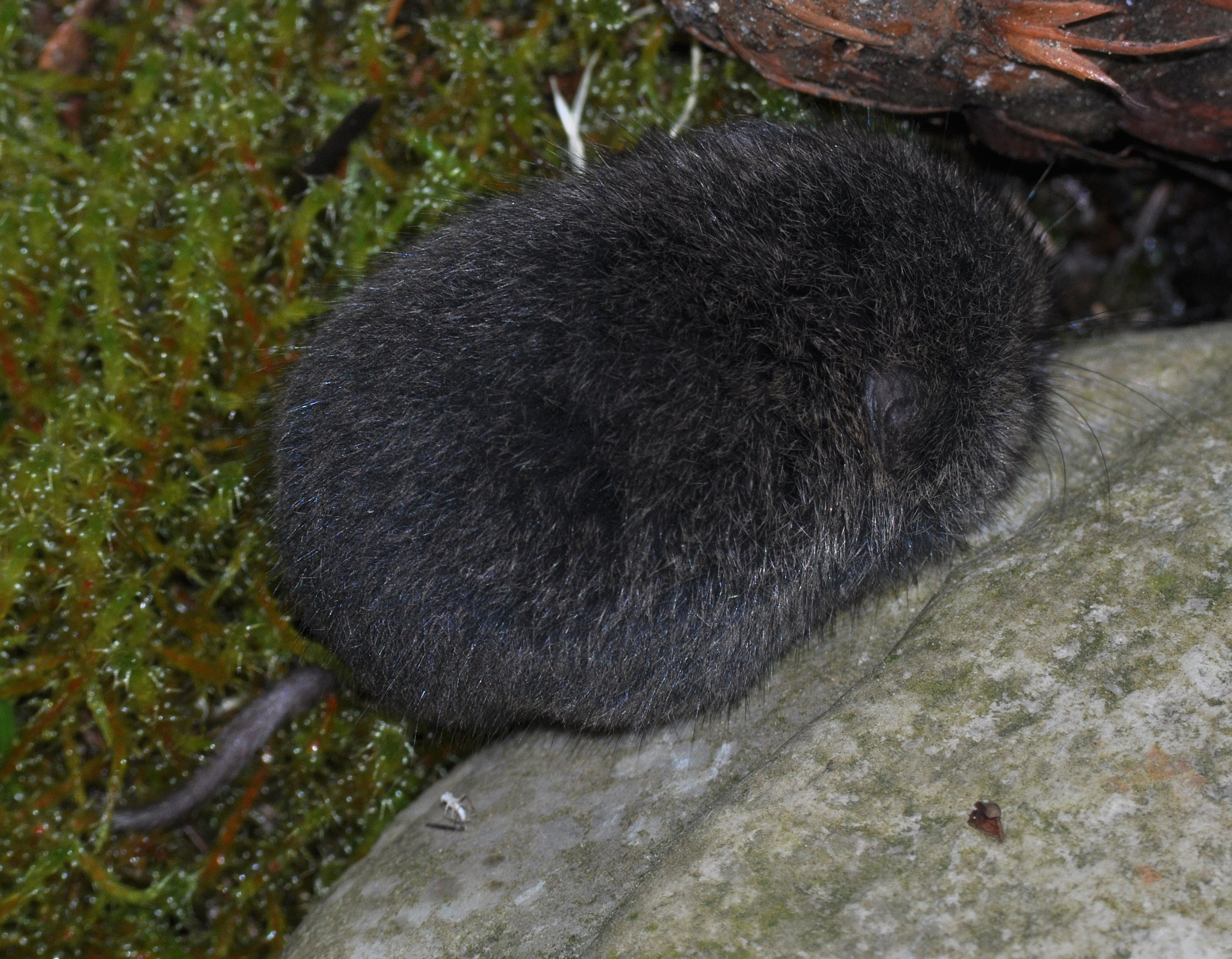

Conservation status
- Least Concern (IUCN 3.1)

Scientific classification
- Kingdom: Animalia
- Phylum: Chordata
- Class: Mammalia
- Order: Rodentia
- Family: Cricetidae
- Subfamily: Arvicolinae
- Genus: Microtus
- Subgenus: Mynomes
- Species: M. townsendii

Binomial name
- Microtus townsendii (Bachman, 1839)

Synonyms
- M. cowani Guiguet, 1955; M. cummingi Hall, 1936; M. laingi Anderson and Rand, 1943; Arvicola occidentalis Peale, 1848; M. pugeti Dalquest, 1940; Arvicola tetramerus Rhoads, 1894

= Townsend's vole =

Species of rodent

Townsend's vole (Microtus townsendii) is a species of rodent in the family Cricetidae, the sister species of M. canicaudus. It is found in temperate grasslands of British Columbia in Canada and in the states of Washington and Oregon in the United States.

Greek root words for "small ear" are the source for the genus name Microtus. American naturalist and writer John Kirk Townsend collected the type specimen in 1835, which accounts for the second part of the name.

== Description ==
Townsend's vole is one of the largest voles in North America, growing to a total length of 169 to 225 mm (6.7 to 8.9 in) including a tail of 48 to 70 mm (1.9 to 2.8 in), and a weight of 48 to 73 g (1.7 to 2.6 oz). The ears are wide and prominent, being clearly visible above the fur, which is thin and coarse. The upper surface is dark brown with many guard hairs with black tips and the underparts are paler. The feet are slate grey and the tail is blackish above and dark brown beneath. Juveniles are generally darker than adults with dark grey underparts and black tails and feet.

== Distribution and habitat ==
Townsend's vole is found in the extreme west of North America. Its range extends from Vancouver Island, British Columbia southwards through Washington state and Oregon to Humboldt Bay in California. It occurs from sea level to altitudes of 1,830 m (6,000 ft) in the Olympic Mountains and 915 m (3,002 ft) in the Cascade Range. These voles typically live in wet meadows, marshes, flood plains, wet areas with rank vegetation and salt marshes.

The population can become extremely dense, so that it impacts or excludes other species. Their proliferation rate makes them a good source of food for many species.

== Biology ==
Townsend's vole lives in a burrow system and creates runways among the vegetation in its habitat. The runways are used all year round by successive generations of voles and may be 2.5 to 5 cm (1 to 2 in) deep. In the summer the voles may take advantage of the denser cover available and also move about elsewhere. Feces are deposited in the runways and large latrines may form, often at intersections. These latrines have been reported as reaching dimensions of 18 by 8 cm (7 by 3 in) with a height of up to 13 cm (5 in). Nests may be built on the surface of the ground or on hummocks, and this allows the vole to live in seasonally-flooded areas where its burrows are sometimes underwater. Both underground and surface nests are made of grasses.

Townsend's vole feeds on soft green plant material such as rushes, tules, grasses, sedges, horsetails, clovers, alfalfa, blue-eyed grass and purple-eyed grass. They also store the bulbous roots of American wild mint, consuming them during the winter even though plenty of succulent green food is available at that time.

Breeding takes place between February and October. The gestation period is about 23 days and the litter size ranges from one to nine young with an average of four, larger females usually having larger litters. The offspring are weaned at about sixteen days of age.

== Status ==
Townsend's vole has a wide range and undergoes large swings in population. Over the long term, the population seems to be steady and in some localities this vole is very plentiful, having been recorded at densities as high as eight hundred individuals per hectare. No particular threats to this species have been recognised; the International Union for Conservation of Nature assessed its conservation status as being of "least concern".
