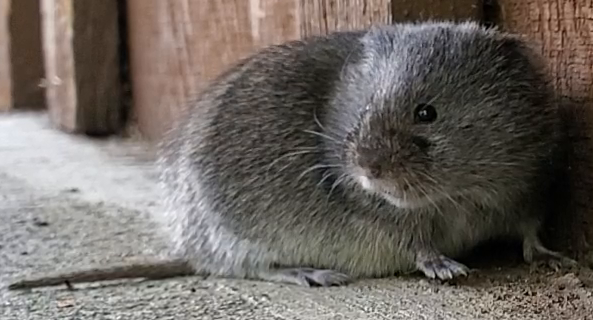

Scientific classification
- Kingdom: Animalia
- Phylum: Chordata
- Class: Mammalia
- Order: Rodentia
- Family: Cricetidae
- Subfamily: Arvicolinae
- Genus: Microtus
- Subgenus: Mynomes
- Species: M. drummondii

Binomial name
- Microtus drummondii (Audubon & Bachman, 1854)

Synonyms
- Microtus pennsylvanicus drummondii

= Western meadow vole =

Species of mammal

The western meadow vole (Microtus drummondii) is a species of North American vole found in western North America, the midwestern United States, western Ontario, Canada, and formerly in Mexico. It was previously considered conspecific with the eastern meadow vole (M. pennsylvanicus), but genetic studies indicate that it is a distinct species. It is sometimes called the field mouse or meadow mouse, although these common names can also refer to other species.

== Distribution ==
It ranges from Ontario west to Alaska, and south to Missouri, north-central Nebraska, the northern half of Wyoming, and central Washington south through Idaho into north-central Utah. A disjunct subset of its range occurs from central Colorado to northwestern New Mexico. An isolated population was formerly found in Chihuahua, Mexico, but has since been extirpated. The United States portion of the Souris River is alternately known as the Mouse River because of the large numbers of field mice that lived along its banks.

== Plant communities ==
In eastern Washington and northern Idaho, meadow voles are found in relative abundance in sedge (Carex sp.) fens, but not in adjacent cedar (Thuja sp.)-hemlock (Tsuga sp.), Douglas-fir (Pseudotsuga menziesii), or ponderosa pine (Pinus ponderosa) forests. Meadow voles are also absent from fescue (Festuca sp.)-snowberry (Symphoricarpos sp.) associations. Moisture may be a major factor in habitat use; possibly the presence of free water is a deciding factor.

In southeastern Montana, western meadow voles were the second-most abundant small mammal (after deer mice, Peromyscus maniculatus) in riparian areas within big sagebrush (Artemisia tridentata)-buffalo grass (Bouteloua dactyloides) habitats. Western meadow voles are listed as riparian-dependent vertebrates in the Snake River drainage of Wyoming. In a compilation of 11 studies on small mammals, western meadow voles were reported in only three of 29 sites in subalpine forests of the central Rocky Mountains. Their range extensions were likely to be related to irrigation practices. They are now common in hayfields, pastures, and along ditches in the Rocky Mountain states. In Pipestone National Monument, Minnesota, western meadow voles were present in riparian shrublands, tallgrass prairie, and other habitats.

== Habitat ==
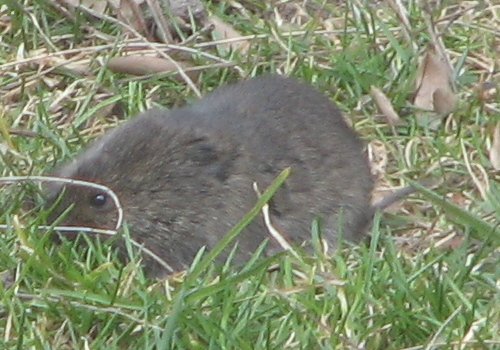
In Michigan.

In an Iowa prairie restoration project, meadow voles experienced an initial population increase during the initial stage of vegetation succession (old field dominated by foxtail grass (Setaria spp.), red clover (Trifolium pratense), annual ragweed (Ambrosia artemisiifolia), alfalfa (Medicago sativa), and thistles (Cirsium spp.). However, populations reached their peak abundance during the perennial grass stage of succession from old field to tallgrass prairie. Meadow vole habitat devoid of tree cover and grasses dominated the herb layer. with low tolerance for habitat variation (i. e., a species that is intolerant of variations in habitat, is restricted to few habitats, and/or uses habitats less evenly than tolerant species).

In most areas, meadow voles clearly prefer habitat with dense vegetation. In tallgrass prairie at Pipestone National Monument, they were positively associated with dense vegetation and litter. The variables important to meadow vole habitat in Virginia include vegetative cover reaching a height of 8 to 16 inches (20–41 cm) and presence of litter. Meadow voles appeared to be randomly distributed within a grassland habitat in southern Quebec. Grant and Morris were not able to establish any association of meadow vole abundance with particular plant species. They were also unable to distinguish between food and cover as the determining factor in meadow vole association with dense vegetation. In South Dakota, meadow voles prefer grasslands to Rocky Mountain juniper (Juniperus scopulorum) woodlands. In New Mexico, meadow voles were captured in stands of grasses, wild rose (Rosa sp.), prickly pear (Opuntia sp.), and various forbs; meadow voles were also captured in wet areas with tall marsh grasses.

Open habitat with a thick mat of perennial grass favors voles. In west-central Illinois, they were the most common small mammals on Indian grass (Sorghastrum nutans)-dominated and switchgrass (Panicum virgatum)-dominated study plots. They were present in very low numbers on orchard grass (Dactylis glomerata)-dominated plots. The most stable population occurred on unburned big bluestem (Andropogon gerardii)-dominated plots. In Ontario, meadow voles and white-footed mice (Peromyscus leucopus) occur together in ecotones. Meadow voles were the most common small mammals in oak savanna/tallgrass prairie dominated by northern pin oak (Quercus ellipsoidalis) and grasses including bluejoint reedgrass (Calamagrostis canadensis), prairie cordgrass (Sporobolus michauxianus), big bluestem, switchgrass, and Indian grass.

In Michigan, strip clearcuts in a conifer swamp resulted in an increase in the relative abundance of meadow voles. They were most abundant in clearcut strip interiors and least abundant in uncut strip interiors. Slash burning did not appear to affect meadow vole numbers about 1.5 years after treatment.

== Predators ==
Birds not usually considered predators of mice do take voles; examples include gulls (Larus sp.), northern shrikes (Larius borealis), black-billed magpies (Pica hudsonia), common ravens (Corvus corax), American crows (C. brachyrhynchos), great blue herons (Ardea herodias), and American bitterns (Botaurus lentiginosus).

Major mammalian predators include the badger (Taxidea taxus), striped skunk (Mephitis mephitis), weasels (Mustela and Neogale sp.), martens (Martes americana and M. caurina), domestic dogs (Canis familiaris), domestic cats (Felis catus) and mountain lions (Puma concolor). Other animals reported to have ingested voles include trout (Salmo sp.), Pacific giant salamanders (Dicampton ensatus), garter snakes (Thamnophis sp.), yellow-bellied racers (Coluber constrictor flaviventris), gopher snakes (Pituophis melanoleucas), plains rattlesnakes (Crotalus viridis), and rubber boas (Charina bottae).

In northern prairie wetlands, meadow voles are a large portion of the diets of red foxes (Vulpes vulpes), American mink (Neogale vison), short-eared owls (Asio flammeus), and northern harriers (Circus cyaneus). Voles are frequently taken by racers (Coluber sp.) since both often use the same burrows.

== Management ==
In forest plantations in British Columbia, an apparently abundant (not measured) meadow vole population was associated with a high rate of "not sufficient regeneration"; damage to tree seedlings was attributed to meadow voles and lemmings (Synaptomys sp.).

The cycle of meadow vole abundance is an important proximate factor affecting the life histories of its major predators. Meadow voles are usually the most abundant small mammals in northern prairie wetlands, often exceeding 40% of all individual small mammals present. Numbers of short-eared owls, northern harriers, rough-legged hawks (Buteo lagopus), coyotes (Canis latrans), and red foxes were directly related to large numbers of meadow voles in a field in Wisconsin. Predator numbers are positively associated with meadow vole abundance.

== Threats ==
The species depends heavily on mesic habitats, and in areas on the periphery of its range, which contain distinctive and divergent subspecies, populations may be lost if the wetness of the habitats changes. A distinct Pleistocene relict subspecies, M. d. chihuahuensis, the Chihuahuan vole, was also found in Chihuahua, Mexico, but has not been recorded since 1988 after its habitat was degraded by recreational activities and especially overgrazing, and eventually the marsh was completely drained by the early 2000s. This subspecies displayed notable divergence from other populations and was highly isolated from any others, and would be considered a distinctive subspecies. In addition, two other populations in New Mexico appear to have been extirpated in recent times, likely as a consequence of climate change-induced drying and overgrazing. Due to the heavy association between meadow voles and mesic habitats, they are especially at risk from drying trends in areas at the peripheries of their range, leaving many of these populations at heavy risk of extirpation.
