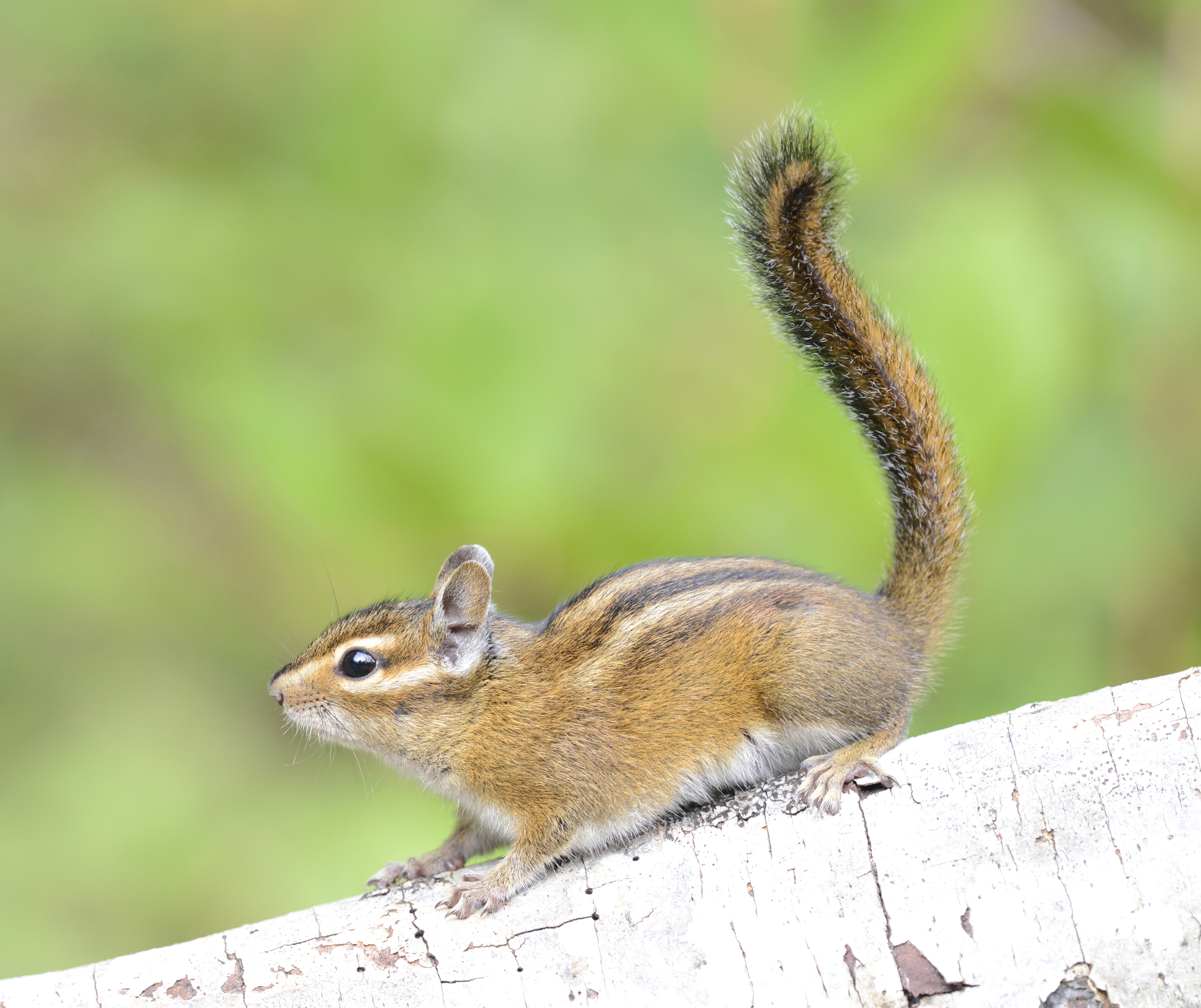

Conservation status
- Least Concern (IUCN 3.1)

Scientific classification
- Kingdom: Animalia
- Phylum: Chordata
- Class: Mammalia
- Order: Rodentia
- Family: Sciuridae
- Genus: Neotamias
- Species: N. townsendii

Binomial name
- Neotamias townsendii (Bachman, 1839)
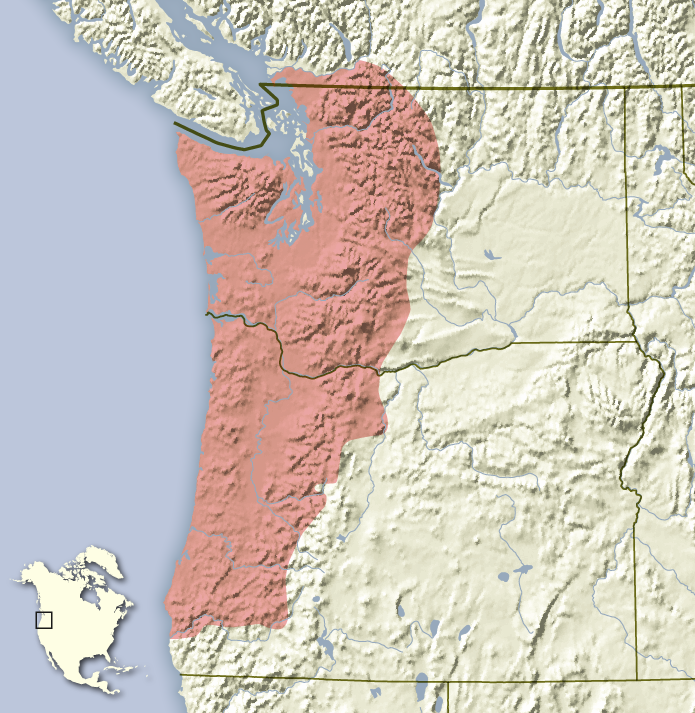

Synonyms
- Tamias townsendii Bachman, 1839

= Townsend's chipmunk =

Species of rodent

Townsend's chipmunk (Neotamias townsendii) is a species of rodent in the squirrel family, Sciuridae. It lives in the forests of the Pacific Northwest of North America, from extreme southwestern British Columbia through western Washington and western Oregon. Townsend's chipmunk is named after John Kirk Townsend, an early 19th-century ornithologist.

== Description ==
A large chipmunk, adults can be 36 cm (14 in) from nose to the tip of its tail. In much of its range, it is the only chipmunk; it can be identified by its tail which is grayish above and reddish below, and by its brown coloration with indistinct tawny stripes.

== Biology ==
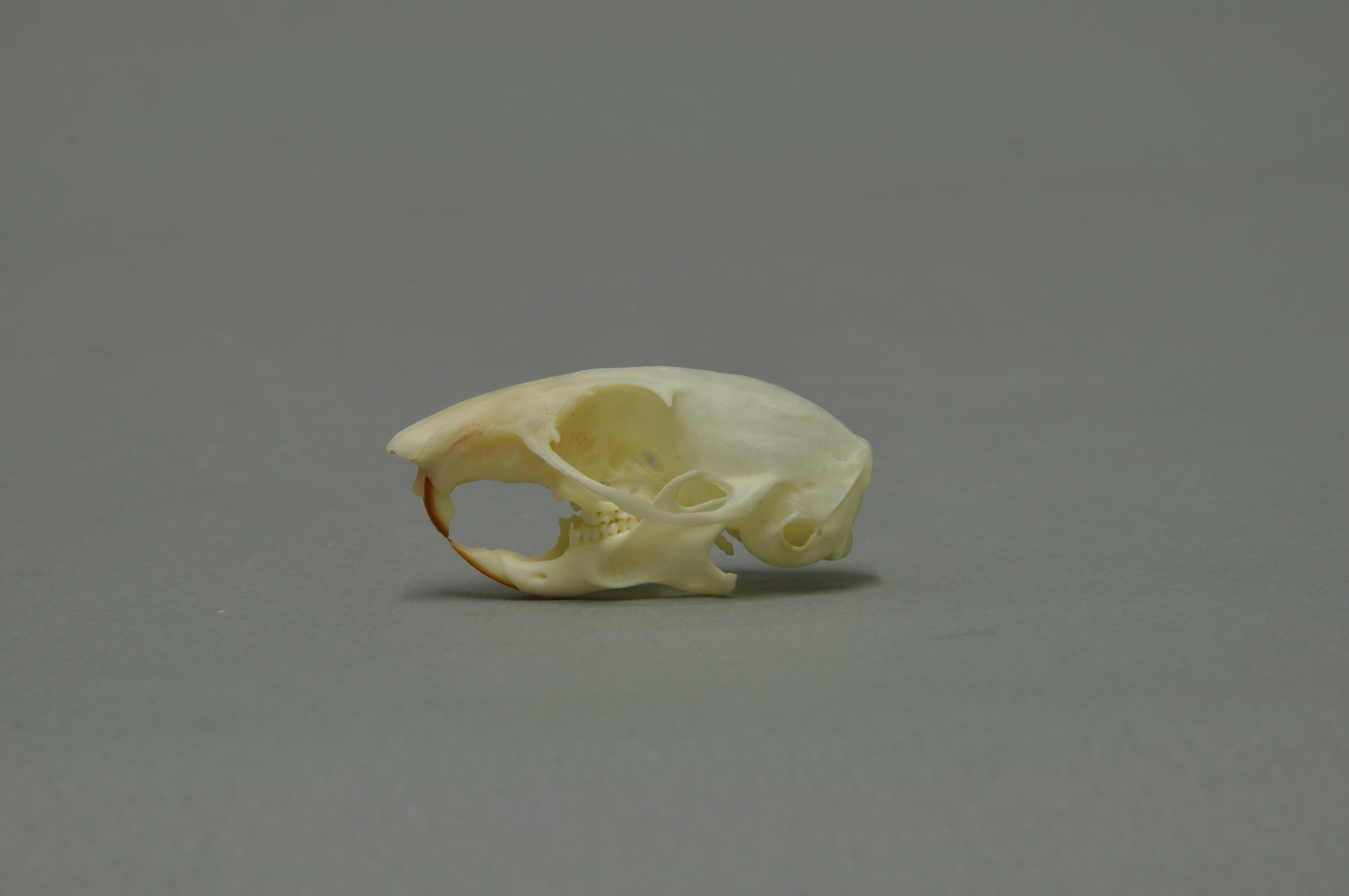
Skull of a Townsend's chipmunk

Townsend's chipmunk hibernates in regions where the winter is harsh, but in other parts of its range that have a more mild climate it can be active year-round. It is omnivorous, eating a variety of plants and insects and even birds' eggs. Townsend's chipmunks in the Oregon Coast Range have higher population densities in areas with dense shrubbery, especially salal (Gaultheria shallon). In the summer and early fall, Townsend's chipmunks eat blackberries, salal berries, and thimbleberries. In the late fall, they eat acorns, huckleberries, maple seeds, thistle seeds, grain seeds, grass, roots, and conifer seeds.
