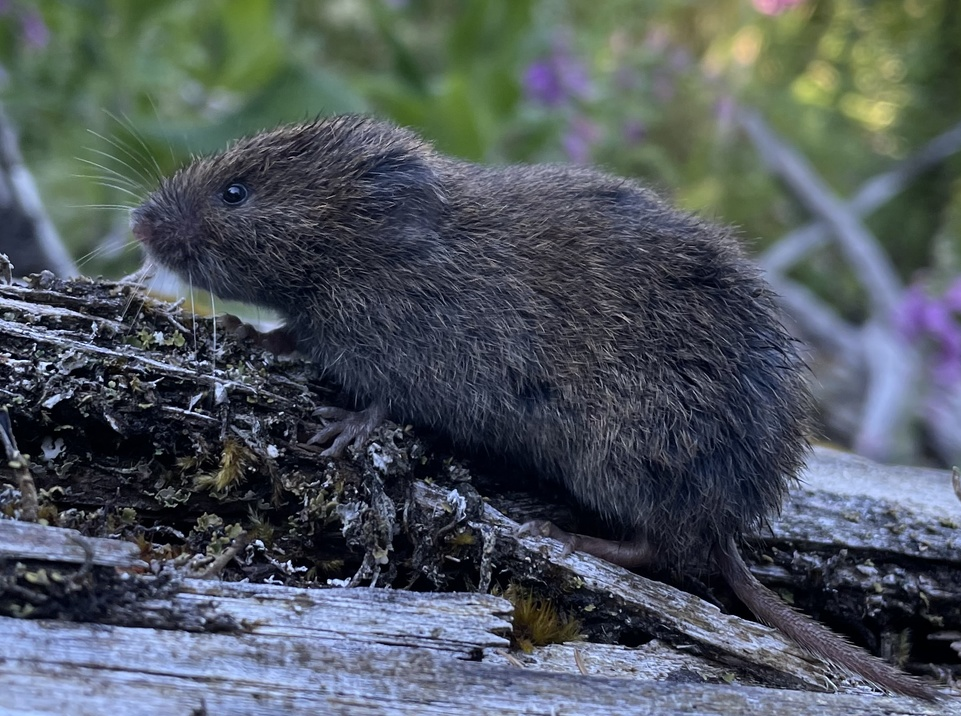
- Microtus oregoni photographed at Wind River Experimental Forest

Conservation status
- Least Concern (IUCN 3.1)

- Secure (NatureServe)

Scientific classification
- Kingdom: Animalia
- Phylum: Chordata
- Class: Mammalia
- Order: Rodentia
- Family: Cricetidae
- Subfamily: Arvicolinae
- Genus: Microtus
- Subgenus: Mynomes
- Species: M. oregoni

Binomial name
- Microtus oregoni (Bachman, 1839)
- Distribution of the creeping vole

Synonyms
- List: Arvicola oregoni Bachman, 1839; M. adocetus Merriam, 1908; M. bairdii Merriam, 1897; M. cantwelli Taylor, 1920; M. morosus Elliot, 1899; M. oregoni Miller, 1896; M. serpens Merriam, 1897

= Creeping vole =

Species of rodent

The creeping vole (Microtus oregoni), sometimes known as the Oregon meadow mouse, is a small rodent in the family Cricetidae. Ranging across the Pacific Northwest of North America, it is found in forests, grasslands, woodlands, and chaparral environments. The small-tailed, furry, brownish-gray mammal was first described in the scientific literature in 1839, from a specimen collected near the mouth of the Columbia River. The smallest vole in its range, it weighs around 19 g (11/16 oz). At birth, they weigh 1.6 g (1/16 oz), are naked, pink, unable to open their eyes, and the ear flaps completely cover the ear openings. Although not always common throughout their range, there are no major concerns for their survival as a species.

== Taxonomy ==
The animal was described in 1839 by John Bachman. The original scientific name was Arvicola oregoni with a common name of the Oregon meadow mouse. The type specimen was an older male collected November 2, 1836 near the mouth of the Columbia River in Oregon. The specimen had been submitted to Bachman for review by John Kirk Townsend. Subsequent authorities state that it was collected at Astoria, Oregon, which is at the mouth of the Columbia River. In 1857, Baird placed Arvicola oregoni in a section Chilotus of the subgenus Arvicola of the genus Arvicola. In 1874, PNAS paper, Coues reclassified Chilotus as a subgenus and refers to the animal as Arvicola (Chilotus) oregonus. Miller subsequently reclassified the animal in the genus Microtus and maintained the subgenus Chilotus. This was the first reference to the animal under its current scientific name Microtus oregoni. It was subsequently reclassified to the subgenus Mynomes, though the American Society of Mammalogists lumps that subgenus's species in with subgenus Pitymys.

== Description ==
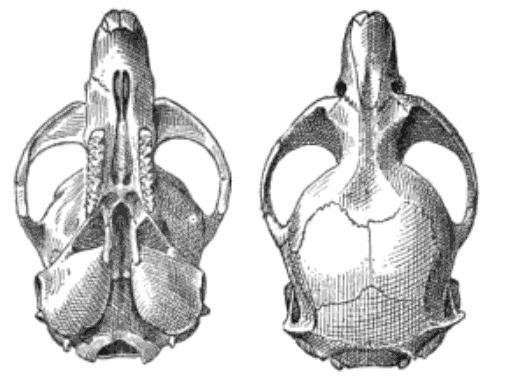
Microtus oregoni skull

Skull dimensions
	Minimum	Maximum
Basal length	20.9 mm (0.82 in)	23.4 mm (0.92 in)
Nasal length	6.7 mm (0.26 in)	7.3 mm (0.29 in)
Zygomatic breadth	14 mm (0.55 in)	14.9 mm (0.59 in)
Mastoid breadth	11 mm (0.43 in)	12.6 mm (0.50 in)
Upper molar alveolus	5.5 mm (0.22 in)	6.1 mm (0.24 in)

On average, creeping voles weigh around 19 g (11/16 oz) with a reported range of 14.5 to 27.5 g (1/2 to 1 oz) The average length is around 140 mm (5.5 in), with a range of around 129 to 154 mm (5.1 to 6.1 in) Compared to other voles within their geographic range, they are the smallest. They have smaller eye opening (around 2 mm (0.079 in) in diameter) compared to other voles that share the same geographic range (sympatric) or have adjacent ranges (parapatric). There are other distinguishing features of the roots and enamel of the molar teeth that help in differentiation. Unlike other voles in the range, only the creeping vole and the (much larger) water vole have five plantar tubercles on the hindfeet.

They are Pentadactyl, although the pollex is reduced in size and lack a claw. They walk with their feet planted firmly on the ground (plantigrade locomotion). The foot pads have a moderate amount of fur.

The fur markings are plumbeous to a dark brown or black. There are sometimes yellowish hair markings as well. The underside fur markings tend to be lighter beige to whitish. The tail may be gray to black and often lighter below.

Creeping voles have a relatively short tail, measuring less than 30% their total body length. They have short ears, which are nearly hairless, though a few black hairs present. They protrude just slightly from the fur around the head. They have eight mammae, with two pairs present in each of the pectoral and inguinal regions.

The skull of the creeping vole has a low, flat profile, with a long and slender snout. The zygomatic arches are somewhat delicate. The incisive foramen is short and wide, but not so much as to be a distinguishing feature. They have small molars.

== Distribution and habitat ==
Creeping voles are found in British Columbia in Canada and in Washington, Oregon and northern California, in the United States. They are found as far north as Port Moody, British Columbia and as far south as Mendocino City, California. The western range in Washington extends east to Mount Aix, Lake Chelan, and Signal Peak. The range in Oregon extends east to the north base of Three Sisters and to Crater Lake. There are variable reports as to their occurrence in the Willamette Valley of Oregon. In California, they are found as far east as Beswick and South Yolla Bolly Mountain.

They are found in coniferous forests and woodlands, grasslands, and chaparral. They are found at sea level through altitudes of nearly 2,400 m (7,900 ft). They are more populous in areas of disturbance than virgin forests. They are burrowing animals and will also use fallen logs, other debris, and patches of grass for cover. The burrows are shallow. They are found in moist forests along the coast, but may do well in drier areas.

It is suspected that ancestral voles migrated from Eurasia 1.2 million years ago. However, no Pleistocene-era fossils of creeping voles have been identified.

== Behavior and ecology ==
Creeping voles establish nests of dry grass in protected areas, such as under logs. The breeding season varies by latitude, but is mainly March to September in Oregon and British Columbia. Gestation lasts around 23 days. Each litter bears three to four young and the females may produce four or five litters a year. The naked, pink newborn young weigh around 1.6 g (1/16 oz). Their eyes are closed and skin flaps cover the ear openings.

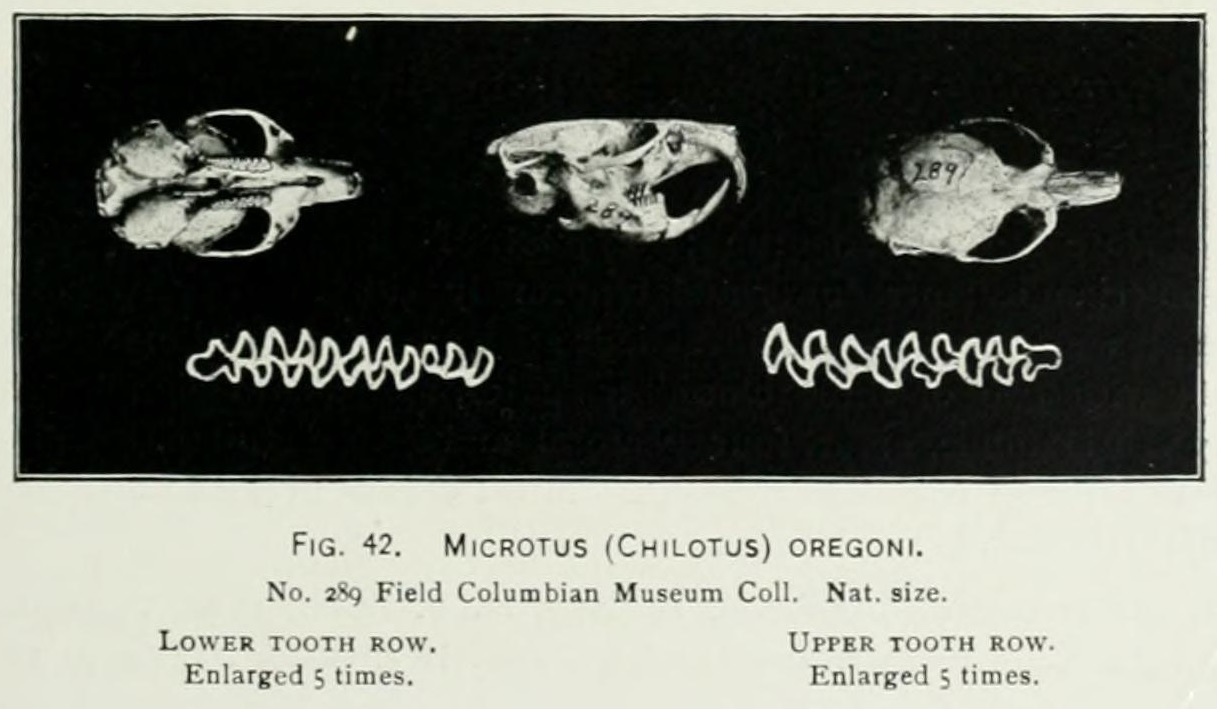
Creeping vole skull and dentition

Creeping voles are primarily nocturnal, though they are sometimes active during the day. They are herbivorous, probably eating forbs and grasses, as well as fungi.

== Genetics ==
Creeping vole females have XO sex chromosomes, while males have XY. Evolutionary geneticists have investigated these sex chromosomal features of creeping voles. A models for the evolution of creeping vole sex chromosomes was published by researchers from the University of Edinburgh in 2001. Recently, it was discovered the Y chromosome has been lost, the male-determining chromosome is a second X that is largely homologous to the female X, and both the maternally inherited and male-specific sex chromosomes carry vestiges of the ancestral Y. This is quite unusual in mammals, as the XY system is fairly stable across a number of mammal species.

== Conservation status ==
Although it is not widely distributed and not always common, the creeping vole is listed as "Least Concern" by the IUCN Red List. The justifications for the listing are the lack of major threats, the stability of populations, and the adaptability of the animal to environmental changes. Treatment of Douglas-fir plantations with herbicides in British Columbia did not affect creeping vole populations. No conservation concerns are raised, since there are thought to be sufficient areas of protected habitat within its range. NatureServe lists the species as secure within its range.
