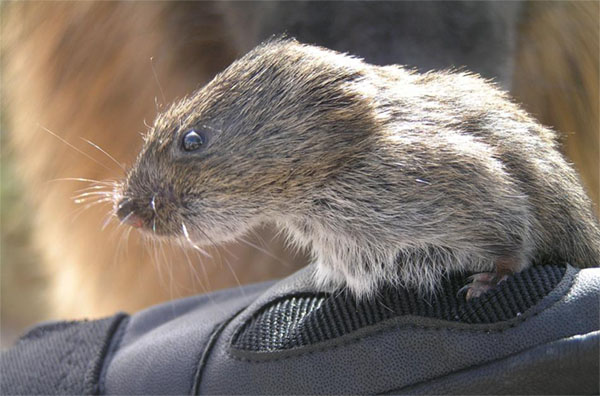

Conservation status
- Least Concern (IUCN 3.1)

Scientific classification
- Kingdom: Animalia
- Phylum: Chordata
- Class: Mammalia
- Order: Rodentia
- Family: Cricetidae
- Subfamily: Arvicolinae
- Genus: Microtus
- Subgenus: Mynomes
- Species: M. montanus

Binomial name
- Microtus montanus (Peale, 1848)

= Montane vole =

Species of rodent

The montane vole (Microtus montanus) is a species of vole native to the western United States and Canada.

== Description ==
Montane voles are medium-sized voles, with a total length of 14 to 22 cm (5.5 to 8.7 in), including the 2 to 7 cm (0.79 to 2.76 in) tail. Adults typically weigh anything from 37 to 85 grams (1.3 to 3.0 oz), with males being slightly larger than females, but the actual weight varies considerably with age, geography, and subspecies. The upper body is covered with fur of a dark brownish shade, again with some variation between individuals. The fur is paler on the flanks, and fades to grey or white on the underparts. The tail exhibits the same color variation, with the fur being dark brown to almost black on the upper surface and grey or white below.

Montane voles possess scent glands on the hips, near the anus, and on the male genitalia. These glands increase in size in response to testosterone, and are therefore particularly large in adult males. At least some of these glands produce unique fatty acid esters, that may function in species recognition. Females have four pairs of teats, running from the chest to the groin.

== Distribution and habitat ==
Montane voles are found in mountainous and other high elevation terrain in the western United States and Canada. Within this region they are generally found in drier climates than other species of vole, and in areas more dominated by grassland than by shrubs. Typical habitats include alpine meadows and grassy areas near streams or lakes; they are also often found in cropland or pasture. Fossils of montane voles have been recovered from as far back as the Irvingtonian, when they appear to have been more widespread across what is now the southwestern United States.

At least fourteen subspecies of montane vole are recognized:

- Microtus montanus montanus - eastern California and southern Oregon
- Microtus montanus arizonensis - eastern Arizona and western New Mexico
- Microtus montanus canescens - central Washington and southern British Columbia
- Microtus montanus codiensis - north western Wyoming
- Microtus montanus dutcheri - central California
- Microtus montanus fucosus - southern Nevada
- Microtus montanus fusus - southern Colorado
- Microtus montanus micropus - northern Nevada
- Microtus montanus nanus - widespread, from Washington and Oregon to Montana and Colorado
- Microtus montanus nevadensis - south western Nevada
- Microtus montanus pratincola - north western Montana
- Microtus montanus rivularis - southern and eastern Utah
- Microtus montanus undosus - central Nevada
- Microtus montanus zygomaticus - north eastern Wyoming

== Biology and behavior ==
Montane voles are herbivorous, although they may also eat small numbers of insects and other arthropods. The majority of their diet consists of forbs, supplemented by seeds, grasses, and fungi. One study in Colorado found that favored foods included vetch and evening primrose. Predators include a range of hawks and owls, weasels, and even coyotes. Montane voles have been reported to form up to 80% of the diet of great horned owls in Idaho.

Montane voles have also been used in the laboratory in studies of African sleeping sickness, since they suffer similar symptoms to humans when infected with the parasite.

Montane voles are nocturnal during the summer, but primarily diurnal during winter. They often inhabit abandoned gopher burrows, although they are also capable of digging their own. Typical burrows are 100 cm (39 in) in length, and reach a depth of 20 cm (7.9 in), although there is considerable variation. Montane voles also construct nests, which are typically cup-shaped, although those used for raising young are globular and about 13 cm (5.1 in) in diameter. Males mark their territory with urine and dung and by rubbing their anal scent glands along the ground.

=== Reproduction ===
The breeding season begins in April or May, and continues until at least August. The start of the season is triggered by chemicals found in fresh spring grass, and coincides with the snowmelt. Since chemicals in older, late summer grass, depress the reproductive drive, the exact end of the season may vary from year to year, and some individuals have been reported to breed in midwinter in recent decades.

Males mate with multiple females if the opportunity arises, and have no preference for unmated females over those that have previously mated. Females do not have regular estrus cycles, and their reproductive status is apparently induced by chemical signals from nearby males.

Gestation lasts 21 days, and results in the birth of five to eight pups. The young are born blind and helpless, and are not capable of standing until four days after birth, around the time that they first begin to develop fur. Their eyes open after about ten days, and they are weaned at around fourteen days. The pups leave the nest a day or so after weaning, when the female begins to prepare for a new litter.

The female may raise three to four litters in a year. Young born early in the year may reach sexual maturity in as little as four weeks, but those born in the fall do not do so until spring.
