= List of mammals of Kazakhstan =

This is a list of the mammal species recorded in Kazakhstan. Kazakhstan has 124 mammal species, of which one is critically endangered, five are endangered, 12 are vulnerable, and four are near threatened. One of the species listed for Kazakhstan can no longer be found in the wild.

Icons which state each species' global IUCN status:
CR	Critically Endangered	In imminent risk of extinction in the wild
EN	Endangered	Facing an extremely high risk of extinction in the wild
VU	Vulnerable	Facing a high risk of extinction in the wild
NT	Near Threatened	Doesn't meet any criteria that would categorise it as risking extinction but likely to in the future
LC	Least Concern	No current identifiable risks to this species
DD	Data Deficient	Inadequate information to make an assessment of the risks to this species

== Order: Artiodactyla (even-toed ungulates) ==
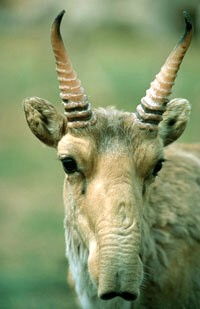
Saiga antelope

The even-toed ungulates are ungulates whose weight is borne about equally by the third and fourth toes, rather than mostly or entirely by the third as in perissodactyls. There are about 220 artiodactyl species, including many that are of great economic importance to humans.

- Family: Cervidae (deer)
  - Subfamily: Cervinae
    - Genus: Cervus
      - Wapiti, C. canadensis LC
      - Central Asian red deer C. hanglu LC
        - Bactrian deer, C. h. bactrianus
  - Subfamily: Capreolinae
    - Genus: Alces
      - Moose, A. alces LC
    - Genus: Capreolus
      - Siberian roe deer, C. pygargus LC
- Family: Moschidae (musk deer)
  - Genus: Moschus
    - Siberian musk deer, M. moschiferus VU
- Family: Bovidae (cattle, antelope, sheep, goats)
  - Subfamily: Antilopinae
    - Genus: Gazella
      - Goitered gazelle, G. subgutturosa VU
    - Genus: Saiga
      - Saiga antelope, S. tatarica NT
  - Subfamily: Caprinae
    - Genus: Capra
      - Siberian ibex, C. sibrica NT
    - Genus: Ovis
      - Argali, O. ammon NT
      - Urial, O. vignei VU
- Family: Suidae (pigs)
  - Subfamily: Suinae
    - Genus: Sus
      - Wild boar, S. scrofa LC

== Order: Carnivora (carnivorans) ==
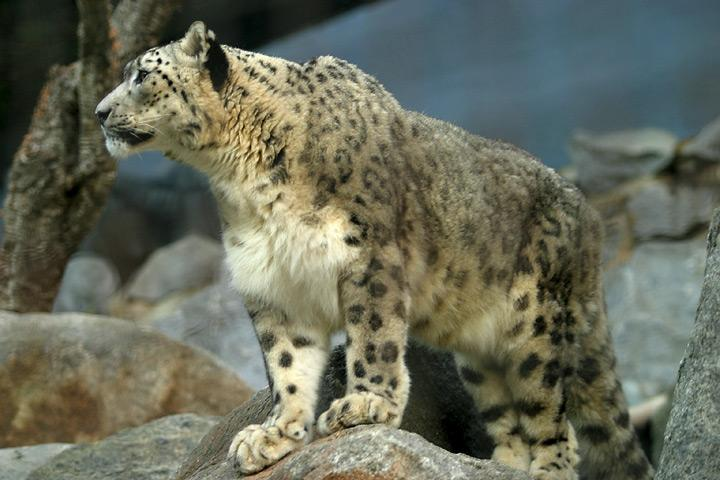
Snow leopard

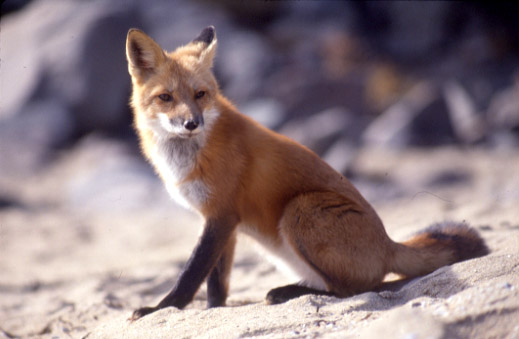
Red fox

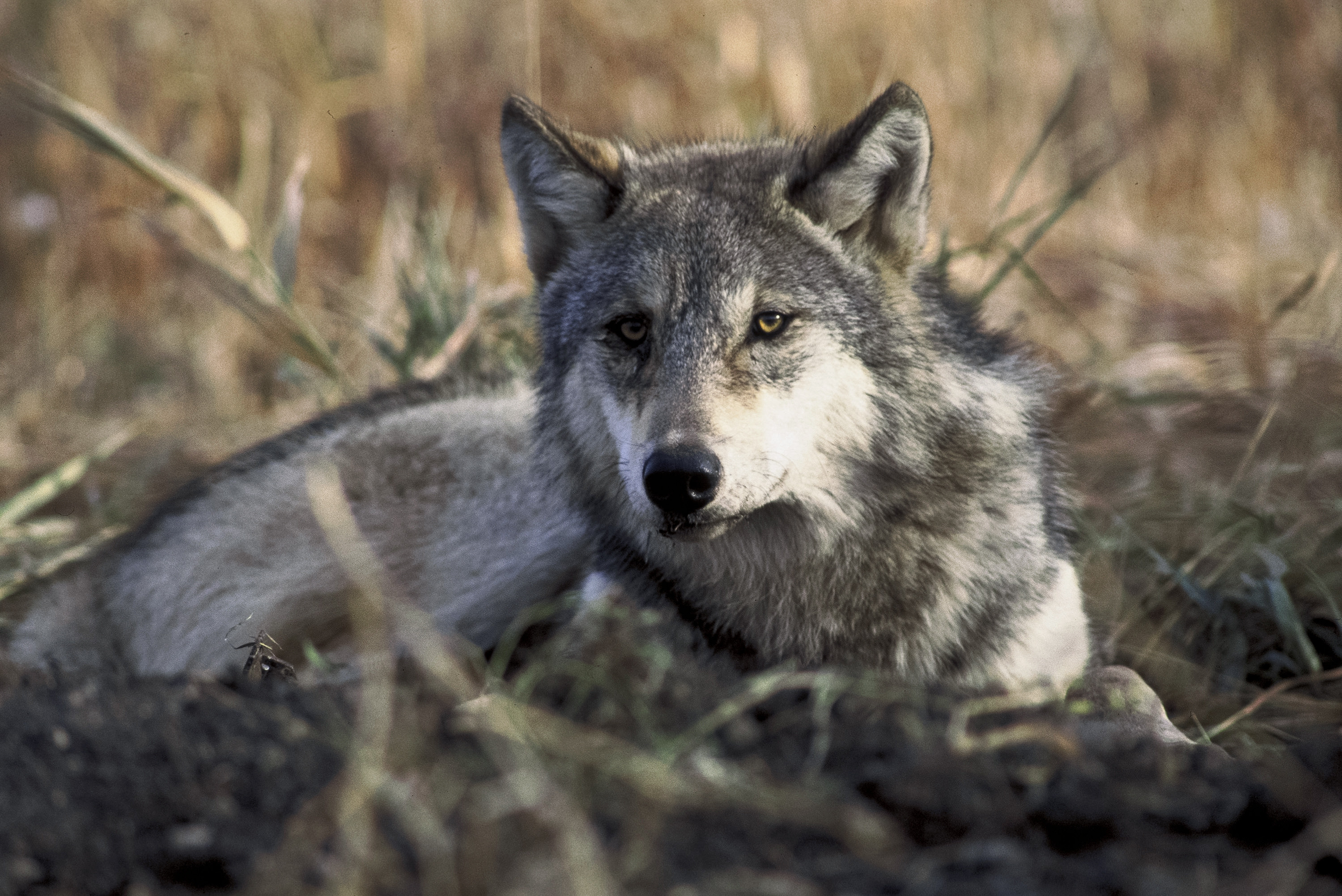
Gray wolf

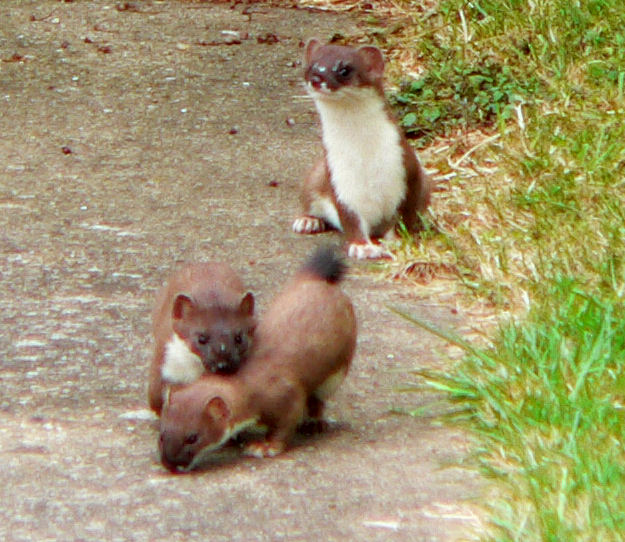
Stoat

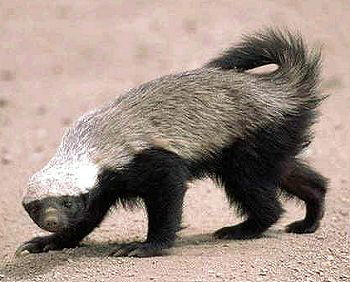
Honey badger

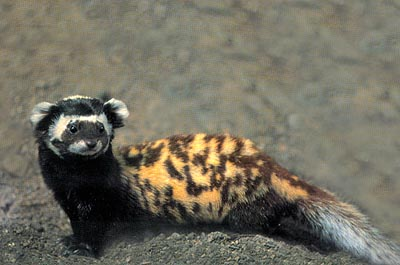
Marbled polecat

There are over 260 species of carnivorans, the majority of which feed primarily on meat. They have a characteristic skull shape and dentition.

- Family: Felidae (cats)
  - Subfamily: Felinae
    - Genus: Caracal
      - Caracal, C. caracal LC
    - Genus: Felis
      - Jungle cat, F. chaus LC
      - African wildcat, F. lybica LC
        - Asiatic wildcat, F. l. ornata
      - Sand cat, F. margarita LC
    - Genus: Lynx
      - Eurasian lynx, L. lynx LC
    - Genus: Otocolobus
      - Pallas's cat, O. manul LC
  - Subfamily: Pantherinae
    - Genus: Panthera
      - Leopard, P. pardus VU
      - Snow leopard, P. uncia VU
- Family: Canidae (dogs, foxes)
  - Genus: Canis
    - Golden jackal, C. aureus LC
    - Gray wolf, C. lupus LC
  - Genus: Vulpes
    - Corsac fox, V. corsac LC
    - Red fox, V. vulpes LC
- Family: Ursidae (bears)
  - Genus: Ursus
    - Brown bear, U. arctos LC
- Family: Mustelidae (mustelids)
  - Genus: Gulo
    - Wolverine, G. gulo LC
  - Genus: Lutra
    - European otter, L. lutra NT
  - Genus: Martes
    - Beech marten, M. foina LC
    - European pine marten, M. martes LC
    - Sable, M. zibellina LC
  - Genus: Meles
    - Asian badger, M. leucurus LC
  - Genus: Mellivora
    - Honey badger, M. capensis LC
  - Genus: Mustela
    - Mountain weasel, M. altaica NT
    - Stoat, M. erminea LC
    - Steppe polecat, M. eversmannii LC
    - Least weasel, M. nivalis LC
  - Genus: Vormela
    - Marbled polecat, V. peregusna VU
- Family: Phocidae (earless seals)
  - Genus: Pusa
    - Caspian seal, P. caspica EN

== Order: Chiroptera (bats) ==
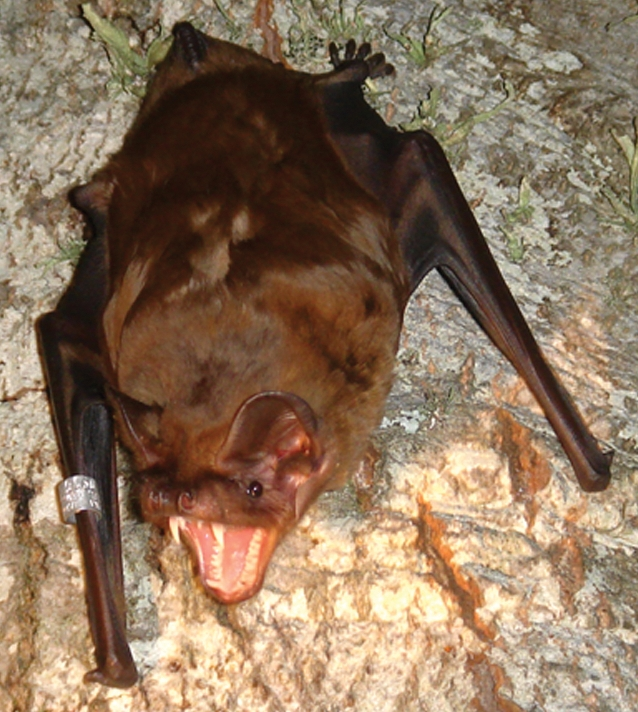
Greater noctule bat

The bats' most distinguishing feature is that their forelimbs are developed as wings, making them the only mammals capable of flight. Bat species account for about 20% of all mammals.

- Family: Vespertilionidae
  - Subfamily: Myotinae
    - Genus: Myotis
      - Lesser mouse-eared bat, M. blythii LC
      - Brandt's bat, M. brandti LC
      - Pond bat, M. dasycneme NT
      - Geoffroy's bat, M. emarginatus LC
  - Subfamily: Vespertilioninae
    - Genus: Eptesicus
      - Bobrinski's serotine, Eptesicus bobrinskoi DD
      - Botta's serotine, Eptesicus bottae LC
    - Genus: Hypsugo
      - Savi's pipistrelle, H. savii LC
    - Genus: Nyctalus
      - Greater noctule bat, N. lasiopterus VU
      - Lesser noctule, N. leisleri LC
      - Common noctule, N. noctula LC
    - Genus: Pipistrellus
      - Kuhl's pipistrelle, Pipistrellus kuhlii LC
      - Common pipistrelle, Pipistrellus pipistrellus LC
    - Genus: Plecotus
      - Grey long-eared bat, Plecotus austriacus NT
- Family: Rhinolophidae
  - Subfamily: Rhinolophinae
    - Genus: Rhinolophus
      - Greater horseshoe bat, R. ferrumequinum LC
      - Lesser horseshoe bat, R. hipposideros LC

== Order: Eulipotyphla (hedgehogs, shrews and moles) ==
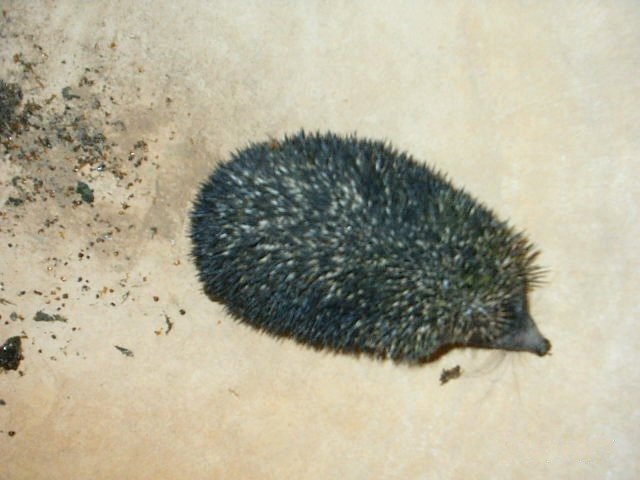
Brandt's hedgehog

Hedgehogs are easily recognised by their spines, shrews closely resemble mice, and moles are stout-bodied burrowers.

- Family: Erinaceidae (hedgehogs)
  - Subfamily: Erinaceinae
    - Genus: Paraechinus
      - Brandt's hedgehog, P. hypomelas LC
- Family: Soricidae (shrews)
  - Subfamily: Crocidurinae
    - Genus: Crocidura
      - Lesser rock shrew, Crocidura serezkyensis LC
      - Lesser white-toothed shrew, C. suaveolens LC
    - Genus: Diplomesodon
      - Piebald shrew, Diplomesodon pulchellum LC
    - Genus: Suncus
      - Etruscan shrew, Suncus etruscus LC
  - Subfamily: Soricinae
    - Tribe: Nectogalini
      - Genus: Neomys
        - Eurasian water shrew, Neomys fodiens LC
    - Tribe: Soricini
      - Genus: Sorex
        - Tien Shan shrew, Sorex asper LC
        - Laxmann's shrew, Sorex caecutiens LC
        - Eurasian pygmy shrew, Sorex minutus LC
- Family: Talpidae (moles)
  - Subfamily: Talpinae
    - Tribe: Desmanini
      - Genus: Desmana
        - Russian desman, Desmana moschata CR

== Order: Lagomorpha (lagomorphs) ==
The lagomorphs comprise two families, Leporidae (hares and rabbits) and Ochotonidae (pikas). Though they can resemble rodents, and were classified as a superfamily in that order until the early 20th century, they have since been considered a separate order. They differ from rodents in a number of physical characteristics, such as having four incisors in the upper jaw rather than two.

- Family: Leporidae (hares and rabbits)
  - Genus: Lepus
    - European hare, L. europaeus LC
    - Mountain hare, L. timidus LC
    - Tolai hare, L. tolai LC
- Family: Ochotonidae (pikas)
  - Genus: Ochotona
    - Alpine pika, O. alpina LC
    - Large-eared pika, O. macrotis LC
    - Steppe pika, O. pusilla LC
    - Turkestan red pika, O. rutila LC

== Order: Perissodactyla (odd-toed ungulates) ==
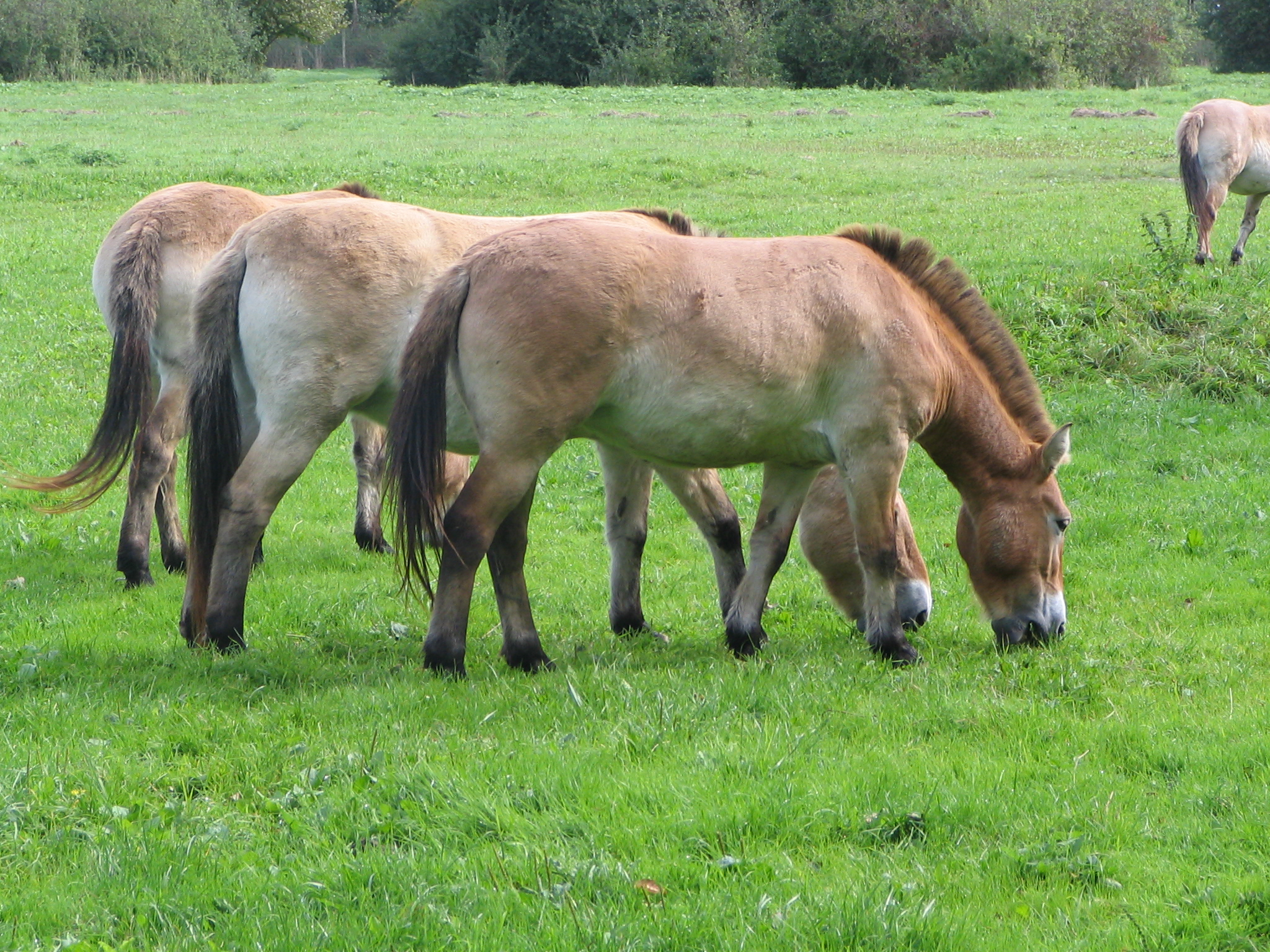
Wild horse

The odd-toed ungulates are browsing and grazing mammals. They are usually large to very large, and have relatively simple stomachs and a large middle toe.

- Family: Equidae (horses etc.)
  - Genus: Equus
    - Wild horse E. ferus EN reintroduced
      - Tarpan, E. f. ferus EX
      - Przewalski's horse, E. f. przewalskii EN reintroduced
    - Onager, E. hemionus NT
      - Mongolian wild ass, E. h. hemionus
      - Turkmenian kulan, E. h. kulan

== Order: Rodentia (rodents) ==
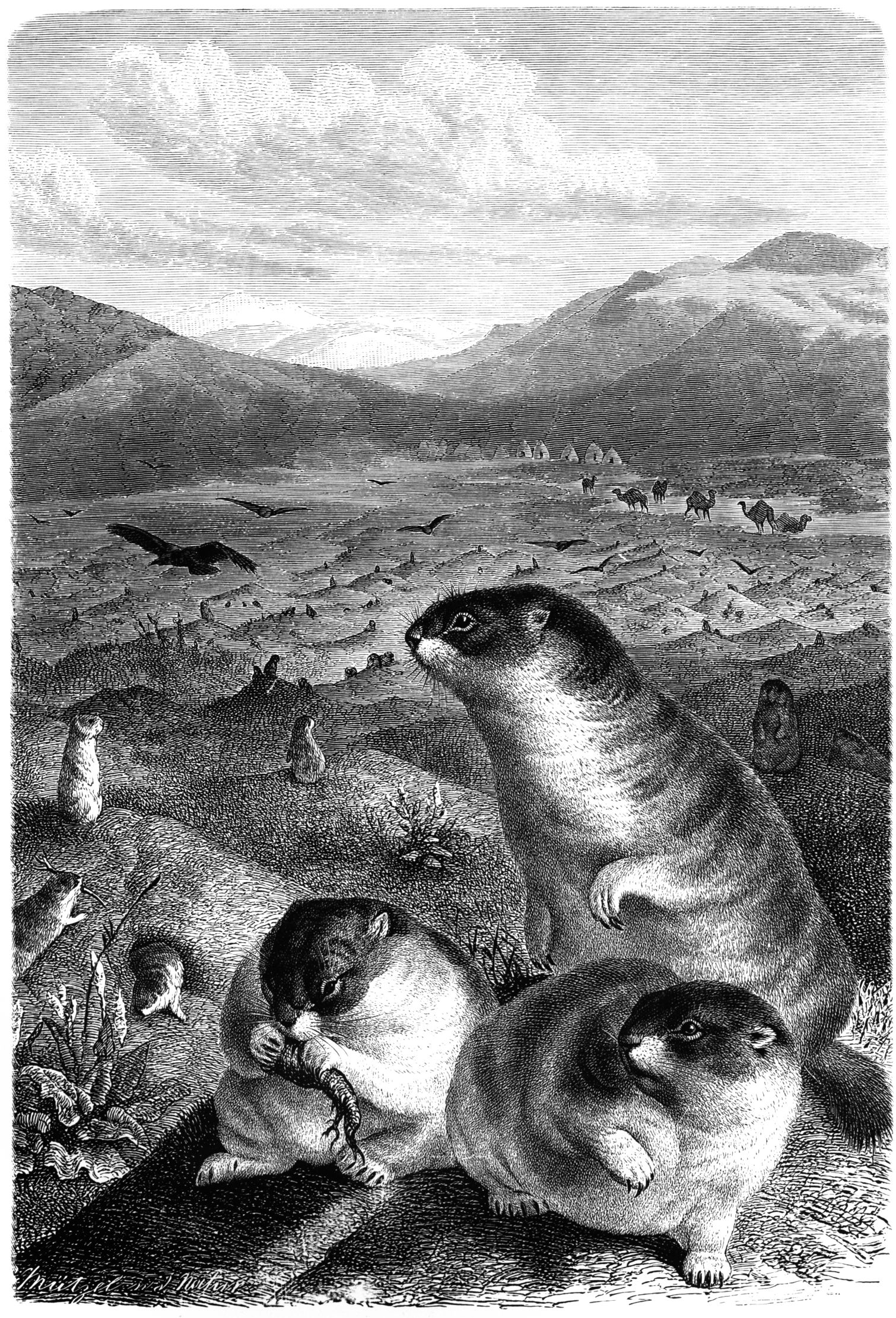
Bobak marmot

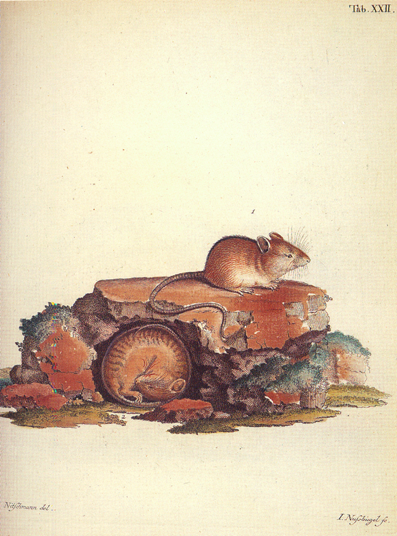
Northern birch mouse

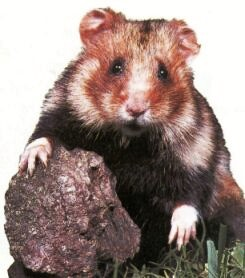
European hamster

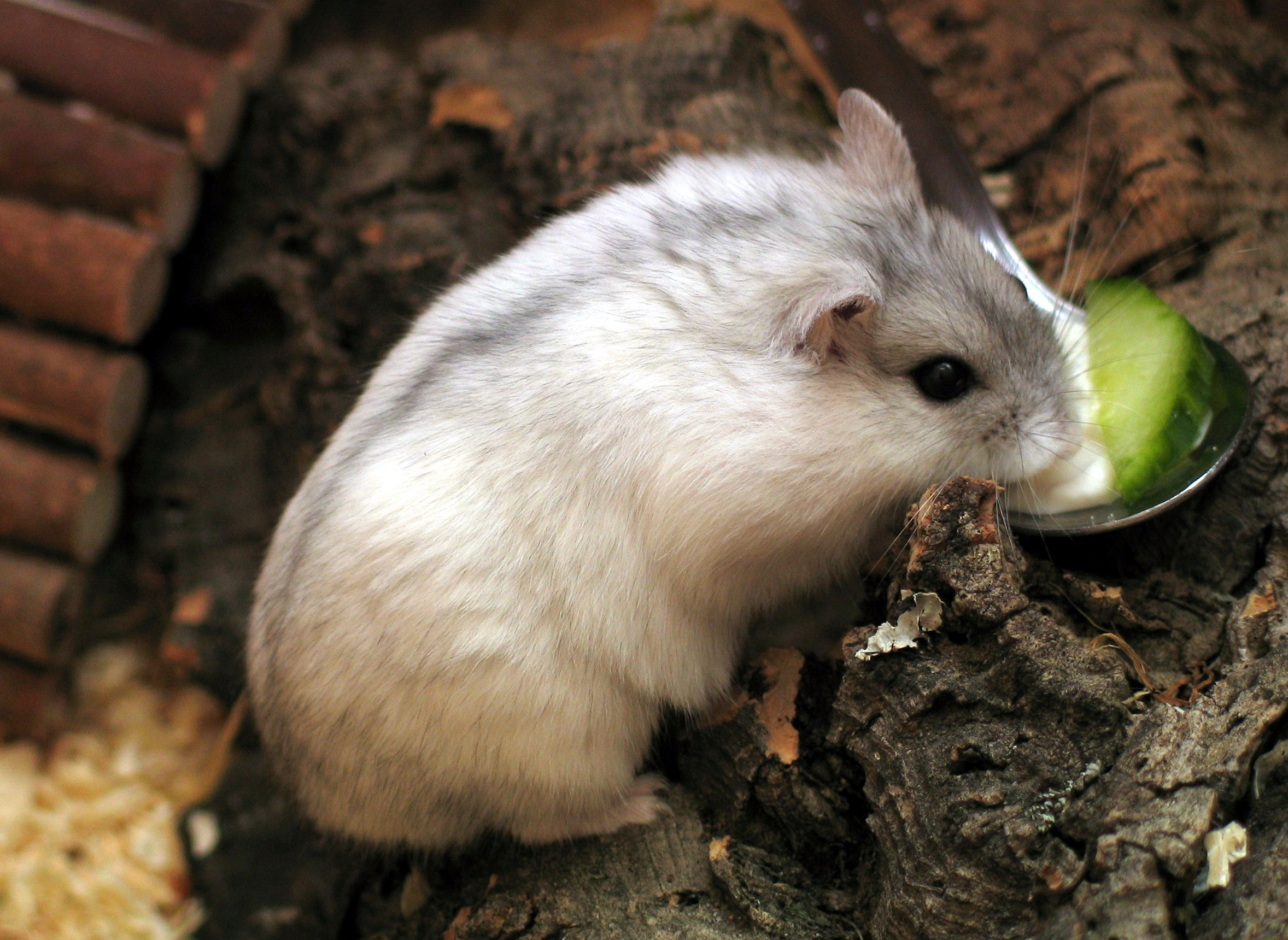
Winter white Russian dwarf hamster

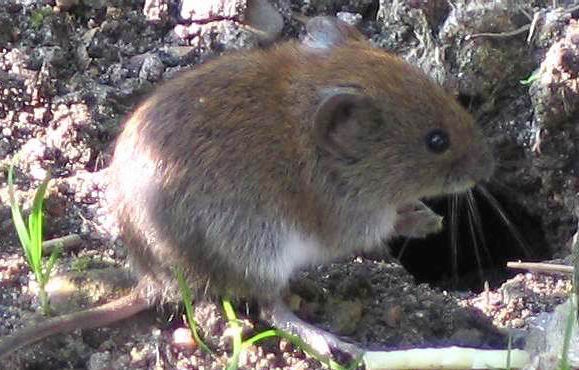
Bank vole

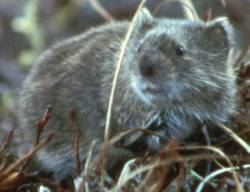
Tundra vole

Rodents make up the largest order of mammals, with over 40% of mammalian species. They have two incisors in the upper and lower jaw which grow continually and must be kept short by gnawing. Most rodents are small though the capybara can weigh up to 45 kg (99 lb).

- Family: Hystricidae (Old World porcupines)
  - Genus: Hystrix
    - Indian crested porcupine, H. indica LC
- Family: Castoridae (beavers)
  - Genus: Castor
    - Eurasian beaver, C. fiber LC
- Family: Sciuridae (squirrels)
  - Subfamily: Xerinae
    - Tribe: Xerini
      - Genus: Spermophilopsis
        - Long-clawed ground squirrel, Spermophilopsis leptodactylus LC
      - Tribe: Marmotini
        - Genus: Eutamias
          - Siberian chipmunk, Eutamias sibiricus LC
        - Genus: Marmota
          - Gray marmot, Marmota baibacina LC
          - Bobak marmot, Marmota bobak LC
          - Menzbier's marmot, Marmota menzbieri VU
        - Genus: Spermophilus
          - Red-cheeked ground squirrel, Spermophilus erythrogenys LC
          - Yellow ground squirrel, Spermophilus fulvus LC
          - Russet ground squirrel, Spermophilus major LC
          - Little ground squirrel, Spermophilus pygmaeus LC
          - Tien Shan ground squirrel, Spermophilus relictus LC
          - Long-tailed ground squirrel, Spermophilus undulatus LC
- Family: Gliridae (dormice)
  - Subfamily: Leithiinae
    - Genus: Dryomys
      - Forest dormouse, Dryomys nitedula LC
    - Genus: Selevinia
      - Desert dormouse, Selevinia betpakdalaensis DD
- Family: Dipodidae (jerboas)
  - Subfamily: Allactaginae
    - Genus: Allactaga
      - Small five-toed jerboa, Allactaga elater LC
      - Great jerboa, Allactaga major LC
      - Severtzov's jerboa, Allactaga severtzovi LC
      - Mongolian five-toed jerboa, Allactaga sibirica LC
      - Vinogradov's jerboa, Allactaga vinogradovi LC
    - Genus: Pygeretmus
      - Lesser fat-tailed jerboa, Pygeretmus platyurus LC
      - Dwarf fat-tailed jerboa, Pygeretmus pumilio LC
      - Greater fat-tailed jerboa, Pygeretmus shitkovi LC
  - Subfamily: Cardiocraniinae
    - Genus: Cardiocranius
      - Five-toed pygmy jerboa, Cardiocranius paradoxus DD
    - Genus: Salpingotus
      - Thick-tailed pygmy jerboa, Salpingotus crassicauda LC
      - Heptner's pygmy jerboa, Salpingotus heptneri DD
      - Pallid pygmy jerboa, Salpingotus pallidus DD
  - Subfamily: Dipodinae
    - Genus: Dipus
      - Northern three-toed jerboa, Dipus sagitta LC
    - Genus: Eremodipus
      - Lichtenstein's jerboa, Eremodipus lichtensteini LC
    - Genus: Paradipus
      - Comb-toed jerboa, Paradipus ctenodactylus LC
    - Genus: Stylodipus
      - Thick-tailed three-toed jerboa, Stylodipus telum LC
  - Subfamily: Sicistinae
    - Genus: Sicista
      - Northern birch mouse, Sicista betulina LC
      - Altai birch mouse, Sicista napaea LC
      - Gray birch mouse, Sicista pseudonapaea DD
      - Southern birch mouse, Sicista subtilis LC
      - Tien Shan birch mouse, Sicista tianschanica LC
- Family: Spalacidae
  - Subfamily: Myospalacinae
    - Genus: Myospalax
      - Siberian zokor, Myospalax myospalax LC
  - Subfamily: Spalacinae
    - Genus: Spalax
      - Giant mole-rat, Spalax giganteus LC
- Family: Cricetidae
  - Subfamily: Cricetinae
    - Genus: Allocricetulus
      - Eversmann's hamster, Allocricetulus eversmanni LC
    - Genus: Cricetulus
      - Long-tailed dwarf hamster, Cricetulus longicaudatus LC
        - Grey dwarf hamster, Cricetulus migratorius LC
      - Genus: Cricetus
        - European hamster, C. cricetus CR
      - Genus: Phodopus
        - Roborovski hamster, Phodopus roborovskii LC
        - Winter white Russian dwarf hamster, Phodopus sungorus LC
  - Subfamily: Arvicolinae
    - Genus: Alticola
      - Flat-headed vole, Alticola strelzowi LC
      - Genus: Clethrionomys
        - Bank vole, Clethrionomys glareolus LC
        - Northern red-backed vole, Clethrionomys rutilus LC
      - Genus: Ellobius
        - Northern mole vole, Ellobius talpinus LC
        - Zaisan mole vole, Ellobius tancrei LC
      - Genus: Eolagurus
        - Yellow steppe lemming, Eolagurus luteus LC
      - Genus: Lagurus
        - Steppe lemming, Lagurus lagurus LC
      - Genus: Microtus
        - Field vole, Microtus agrestis LC
        - Tien Shan vole, Microtus kirgisorum LC
        - Tundra vole, Microtus oeconomus LC
        - Social vole, Microtus socialis LC
- Family: Muridae (mice, rats, voles, gerbils, hamsters)
- Subfamily: Gerbillinae
  - Genus: Meriones
    - Libyan jird, Meriones libycus LC
    - Midday jird, Meriones meridianus LC
    - Tamarisk jird, Meriones tamariscinus LC
  - Genus: Rhombomys
    - Great gerbil, Rhombomys opimus LC
  - Subfamily: Murinae
    - Genus: Apodemus
      - Ural field mouse, Apodemus uralensis LC
    - Genus: Rattus
      - Brown rat, R. norvegicus LC introduced

== Locally extinct ==
The following species are locally extinct in the country:

- Cheetah, Acinonyx jubatus
- Wild Bactrian camel, Camelus ferus
- Dhole, Cuon alpinus
- European mink, Mustela lutreola
- Mongolian gazelle, Procapra gutturosa

== See also ==
- List of chordate orders
- Lists of mammals by region
- Mammal classification
