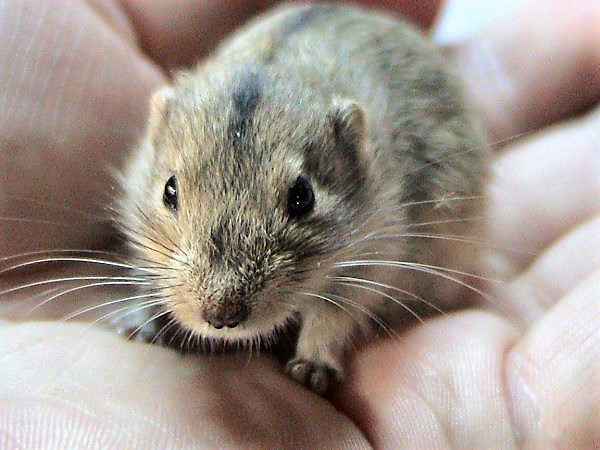
- Steppe lemming (Lagurus lagurus)

Scientific classification
- Kingdom: Animalia
- Phylum: Chordata
- Class: Mammalia
- Order: Rodentia
- Family: Cricetidae
- Subfamily: Arvicolinae
- Tribe: Lagurini; Kretzoi, 1955

Genera
- Eolagurus; Lagurus

= Lagurini =

Lagurini Temporal range: Late Pliocene–present

Tribe of lemmings

Lagurini is a tribe of lemmings in the subfamily Arvicolinae. It contains three species in two genera. Species in this tribe are known as steppe lemmings.

It contains the following species:

- Genus Eolagurus
  - Yellow steppe lemming, E. luteus
  - Przewalski's steppe lemming, E. przewalskii
- Genus Lagurus
  - Steppe lemming, L. lagurus

Phylogenetic evidence based on mtDNA supports the water voles of the genus Arvicola not in fact belonging to the tribe Arvicolini, but rather forming a sister group to the Lagurini. Based on the study, the Lagurini and Arvicola together form a sister group to a clade comprising Hyperacrius and the rest of the Arvicolini.
