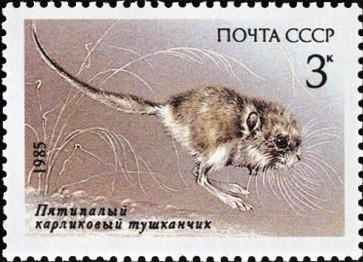
- Cardiocranius paradoxus on a Soviet Union stamp of 1985

Scientific classification
- Kingdom: Animalia
- Phylum: Chordata
- Class: Mammalia
- Infraclass: Placentalia
- Order: Rodentia
- Family: Dipodidae
- Subfamily: Cardiocraniinae; Vinogradov, 1925

= Cardiocraniinae =

Subfamily of rodents

Cardiocraniinae is a subfamily of rodents in the family Dipodidae, named by the Russian zoologist Boris Stepanovich Vinogradov (1891–1958) in 1925. These jumping rodents are small mammals, less than 20 cm long.

== Taxonomy ==
- Genus Cardiocranius
  - Five-toed pygmy jerboa, Cardiocranius paradoxus
- Genus Salpingotulus
  - Baluchistan pygmy jerboa, Salpingotulus michaelis
- Genus Salpingotus, pygmy jerboas
  - Subgenus Anguistodontus
    - Thick-tailed pygmy jerboa, Salpingotus crassicauda
  - Subgenus Prosalpingotus
    - Heptner's pygmy jerboa, Salpingotus heptneri
    - Pale pygmy jerboa, Salpingotus pallidus
    - Thomas's pygmy jerboa, Salpingotus thomasi
  - Subgenus Salpingotus
    - Kozlov's pygmy jerboa, Salpingotus kozlovi
