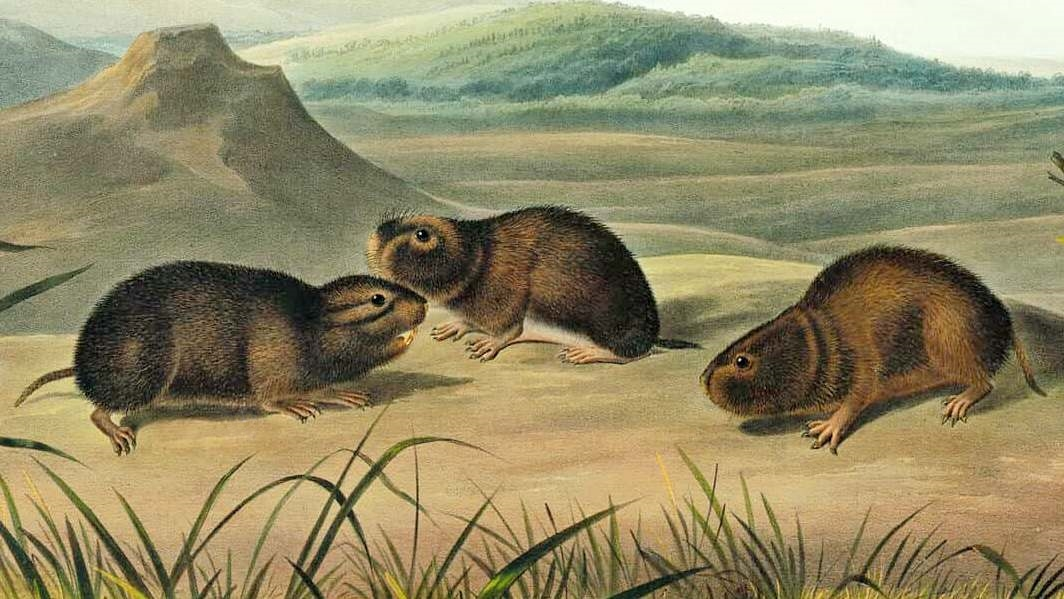

Conservation status
- Least Concern (IUCN 3.1)

Scientific classification
- Kingdom: Animalia
- Phylum: Chordata
- Class: Mammalia
- Infraclass: Placentalia
- Order: Rodentia
- Family: Cricetidae
- Subfamily: Arvicolinae
- Genus: Synaptomys
- Species: S. borealis

Binomial name
- Synaptomys borealis (Richardson, 1828)
- Northern bog lemming range

= Northern bog lemming =

Species of mammal

The northern bog lemming (Synaptomys borealis) is a small North American lemming. It is one of two species in the genus Synaptomys, the other being the southern bog lemming (S. cooperi). Very little information is available about this species' life as they are hard to find and study. The northern bog lemming is a small, reddish-brown rodent with a short tail, and distinct markings on their upper teeth. These markings, along with having four pairs of teats, distinguishes this species from the southern bog lemming. The northern bog lemming lives in wet habitats in North America and is omnivorous, eating herbaceous material and invertebrates. They are thought to be extremely sociable animals and sexually mature at around 6 weeks old. Predators include most medium to larger sized carnivorous and omnivorous mammals that eat smaller mammals. The northern bog lemming is listed as a species of "Least Concern" by the IUCN Red List and is considered threatened or of concern in states such as Minnesota and Maine.

== Taxonomy ==
A common synonym genus that is used to describe northern and southern bog lemmings is the genus Mictomys. Northern bog lemmings are in the subfamily Arvicolinae. The six different genera of lemmings include Dicrostonyx, Lemmus, Eolagurus, Synaptomys, Lagurus, and Myopus. There are currently 20 known species of lemmings.

== Description ==
With no specific sexual dimorphisms, the northern bog lemming has varying shades of brown, reddish-brown, and chestnut fur on the top, with gray to light brown fur on the bottom. Their fur is long and coarse. These lemmings have black beady eyes, a short tail, small ears, grey feet, and a small, flat nose. They are around 4.8 to 5.7 inches (12 to 14 cm) long with a tail that is usually shorter than 1 inch (2.5 cm). They weigh around 1 ounce.

=== Distinguishing features ===
Northern bog lemmings have 16 thin, sharp teeth. They can be distinguished from other rodents by the distinct grooved markings on their top incisors. As they look extremely similar to the southern bog lemming, one can distinguish them by looking at the base of the northern bog lemming's ears for rust-colored fur, something that the southern bog lemming lacks. Northern bog lemming females also have four pairs, or eight individual, nipples while southern bog lemming females only have three pairs.

== Distribution and habitat ==
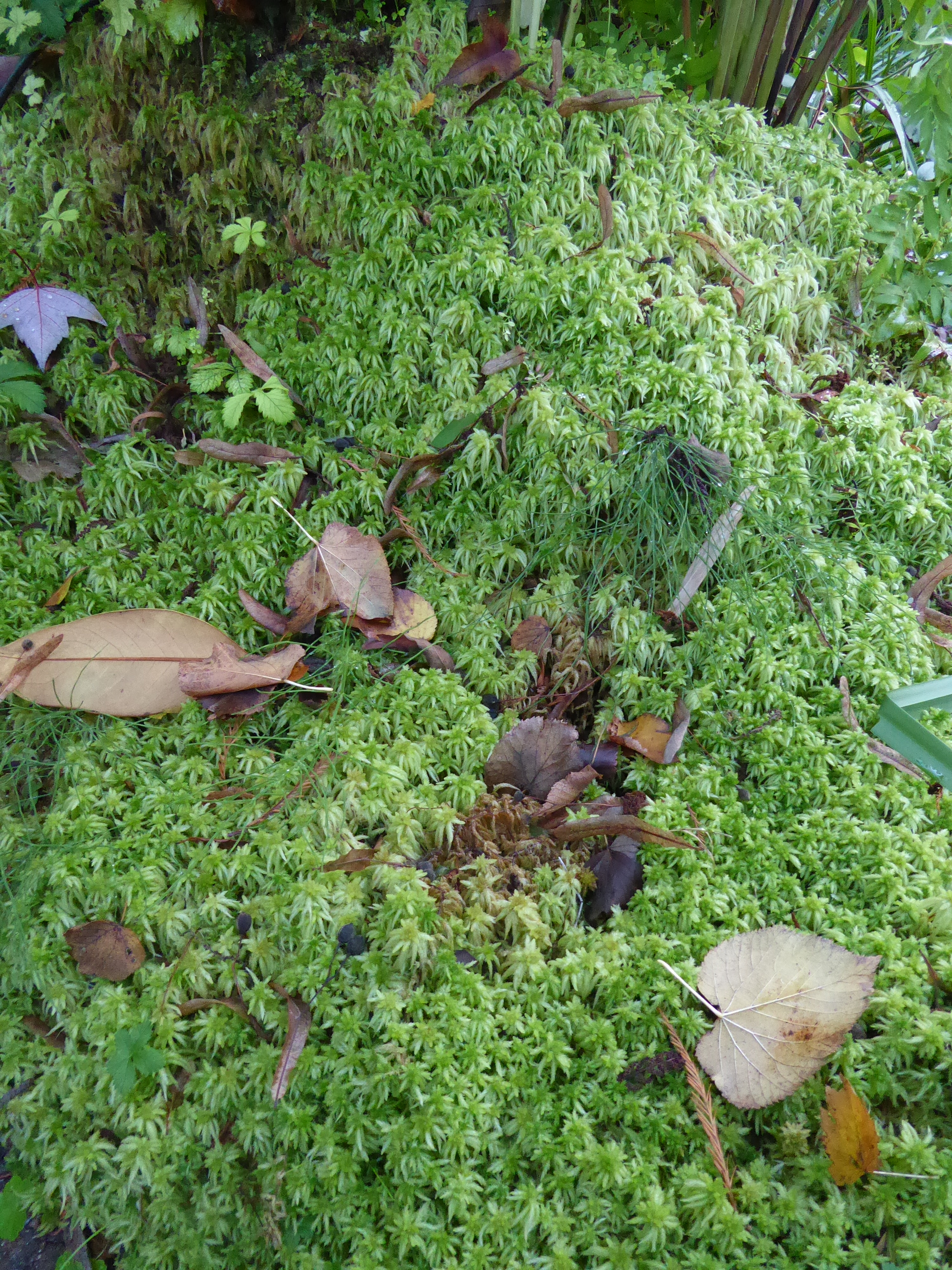
Sphagnum moss - a common habitat characteristic for northern bog lemmings

These animals are found native to wet northern forests, bogs, tundra and meadows in Canada, Alaska, northern Washington, Minnesota, and New England. By the St. Lawrence river in the Appalachian Mountains, a small population of northern bog lemmings can be found as well. Their habitat consists of bogs with Sphagnum, as well as areas with bog like conditions. They are often found living in open areas around wet rocks and fallen logs, wet grassy areas, others mosses, and coniferous forests. At almost all locations where they are found, there is usually some small water source present.

== Diet ==
The northern bog lemming is an omnivorous mammal that primarily feeds on grasses, moss and sedge. Occasionally, they will eat insects, worms, slugs, snails, or fungi. A common habit of these lemmings, which signifies their presence in an area, is that they create surface tunnels under vegetation to travel through and to forage in. They line these tunnels with piles of cut grass. They also leave behind green scat.

== Behavior and ecology ==
These lemmings are cathemeral mammals, which means they are active at different times during the day and the night, and they do not hibernate. As they have been observed to be extremely sociable with others of their species, they often form colonies. They also do not move habitat throughout the year and stay in the same home range for the majority of their lives. On top of building their own tunnels under vegetation and under the surface of the ground, northern bog lemmings often shares habitat with other rodents, and will use their tunnels as well. Rodents that northern bog lemming's share habitat with include meadow voles and northern short tailed shrews.

During the spring, summer and fall when there is no snow cover, northern bog lemmings are most active below the earth's surface due to threats of predators. During this time, they live in burrows built underground, under fallen logs, or in sphagnum moss. Northern bog lemmings are active above ground most of the winter season as the risk of coming into contact with predators is lower. In this season, they build their nests between the snow and the ground layer. Their nests are built from the grasses, dried leaves, moss, and sedges they find in their habitat, as well as their own fur, and are spherical in shape.

=== Reproduction ===
At ages of five or six weeks, northern bog lemmings are thought to be sexually mature. Females tend to have more than one litter per season and each litter contains anywhere from two to eight offspring. The season for breeding for the northern bog lemming is thought to be from the spring (May) to early fall (end of August). The average size of a litter is thought to be four to five offspring and they are born blind, without fur, and are altricial.

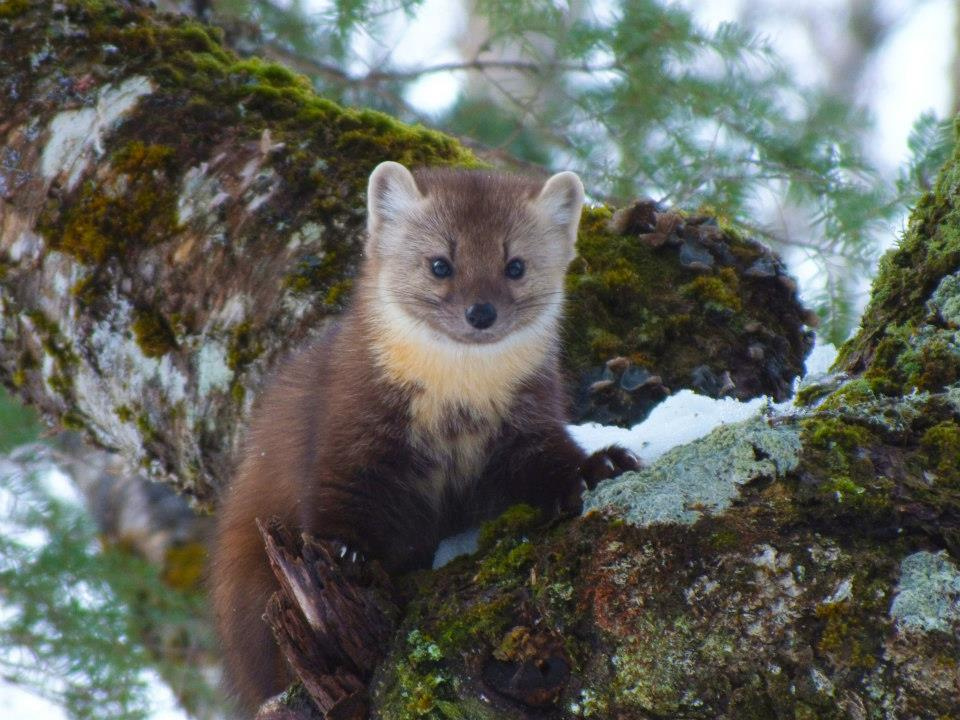
Pine marten (Martes americana) - one predator of the northern bog lemming.

=== Communication ===
It is thought that northern bog lemmings use touch, scent markings, and other chemical signaling to communicate. They strategically leave scent markers throughout their tunnels in the form of feces to let other animals know their tunnels are currently occupied by them, and in active use. Tunnels that do not include scent markings or grass clippings have been abandoned by lemmings.

=== Predators ===
Northern bog lemmings have a variety of predators. Their predators include pine martens, weasels, owls, and predatory raptors such as hawks. Other predators include snakes.

== Threats and conservation status ==
The northern bog lemming's habitat has been decreasing in a northwards direction. Due to their scattered, small populations found in isolated areas, it is believed by the state of Minnesota that there is almost no gene flow between northern bog lemming populations. This lack of gene flow between these small populations can cause them, over time, to lose genetic diversity, and be more susceptible to genetic drift and inbreeding depression. This means that when experiencing environmental or anthropogenic disturbances, such as droughts, climate change, habitat loss, or habitat degradation, these populations may be less likely to bounce back and may experience total die-offs. Additional threats to the northern bog lemming may include competition with other species as habitat area decreases, habitat loss and degradation due to logging, infrastructure building, and human recreational activities, as well as threats of pollution and climate change.

The northern bog lemming is listed as a species of "Least Concern" by the IUCN Red List since 2016. They are listed as "Species of Special Concern" for protection and preservation by the State of Minnesota, and on a federal level, their status is still being considered. Another state where the northern bog lemming is considered threatened is Maine.

== Conservation management plans ==
While no specific plan had been put in place for the northern bog lemming alone, federal protections and management plans applied to peatlands could help this species inadvertently. Through designating certain peatlands as Research Natural Areas, or RNAs, the United States Forest Service bans activities that degrade and pollute peatlands, such as logging, filling, building, livestock grazing and some human recreational activities. These regulations have the potential to save vital habitat for northern bog lemmings without specifically declaring so. Research natural areas are maintained by the forest service and are managed in ways that protects their natural conditions and important ecological services.
