= Synaptomys australis =

Synaptomys australis Temporal range: Pleistocene

Scientific classification
- Kingdom: Animalia
- Phylum: Chordata
- Class: Mammalia
- Infraclass: Placentalia
- Order: Rodentia
- Family: Cricetidae
- Subfamily: Arvicolinae
- Genus: Synaptomys
- Species: †S. australis

Binomial name
- †Synaptomys australis Simpsons, 1928

Extinct species of rodent

Synaptomys australis, the Florida bog lemming, is an extinct species of bog lemming that occurred in Florida during the Late Pleistocene.

== Taxonomy ==
Although the bog lemmings are not indigenous to Florida at the present time, remains are known there from the Pleistocene, indicating the range of these normally cold-adapted rodents extended further south during glaciation events. The Florida bog lemming was described from a lower jaw collected from Pleistocene deposits in 1928. Its taxonomic status as a full species has been questioned however, with some researchers considering it a prehistoric race of the southern bog lemming.

== Description ==
The Florida bog lemming was slightly larger than the living southern bog lemming. It went extinct around 12,000 BP, as a result of glacial retreat and the return of very warm temperatures.
