= Lagurus =

Lagurus is the name of two genera of life forms:

- Lagurus (rodent), a genus of rodents with the steppe lemming as the only living species
- Lagurus (plant), a monotypic genus of grasses containing only Lagurus ovatus, the hare's tail
