= Bog lemming =

Bog lemmings Temporal range: Early Pliocene - recent
- Southern bog lemming

Scientific classification
- Domain: Eukaryota
- Kingdom: Animalia
- Phylum: Chordata
- Class: Mammalia
- Order: Rodentia
- Family: Cricetidae
- Subfamily: Arvicolinae
- Tribe: Lemmini
- Genus: Synaptomys; Baird, 1857

Type species
- Synaptomys cooperi Baird, 1857

Species
- Synaptomys borealis Synaptomys cooperi †Synaptomys australis

Genus of mammals

Synaptomys is a genus of North American lemmings. These animals live in wet forested and open areas. They are small, cylindrical rodents with large heads and short ears, legs, and tails. They eat green vegetation such as grasses and sedges. They are often found in colonies.

== Systematics ==
The genus Synaptomys comprises two extant species and 10 extinct species. S. borealis is sometimes placed in the genus Mictomys.

=== Extant species ===
- Northern bog lemming - S. borealis (Richardson, 1828)
- Southern bog lemming - S. cooperi Baird, 1858

=== Extinct species ===
- Florida bog lemming (S. australis Simpson 1928)
- Bunker's bog lemming (S. bunkeri Hibbard 1939)
- Morgan's bog lemming (S. morgani Martin et al. 2003)

A number of other fossil species have been included here but have since been transferred to other genera, such as Mictomys and Praesynaptomys.
