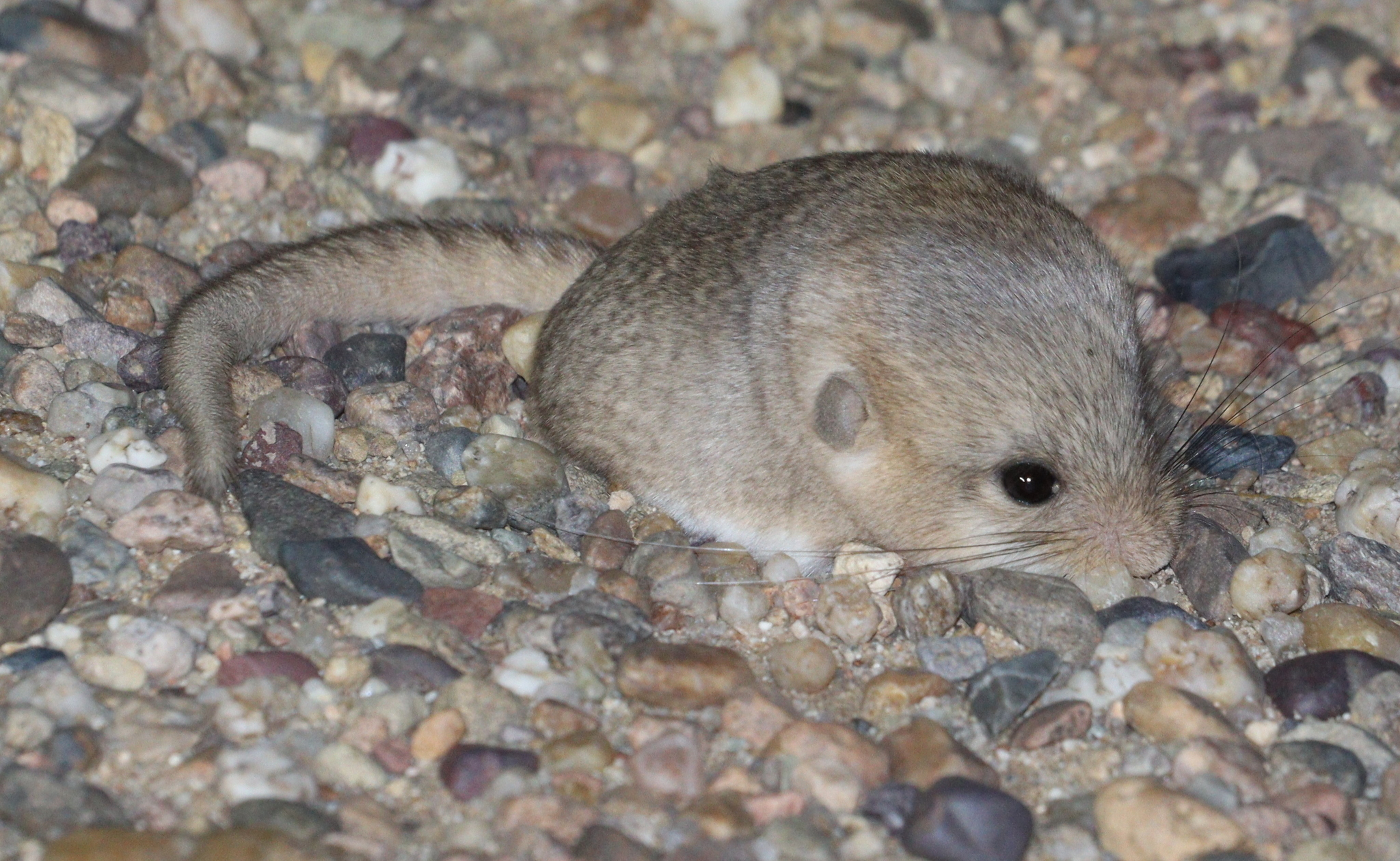
- Bayanlig, Bayankhongor, Mongolia

Conservation status
- Data Deficient (IUCN 3.1)

Scientific classification
- Kingdom: Animalia
- Phylum: Chordata
- Class: Mammalia
- Order: Rodentia
- Family: Dipodidae
- Subfamily: Cardiocraniinae
- Tribe: Cardiocraniini; Vinogradov, 1925
- Genus: Cardiocranius; Satunin, 1903
- Species: C. paradoxus

Binomial name
- Cardiocranius paradoxus Satunin, 1903
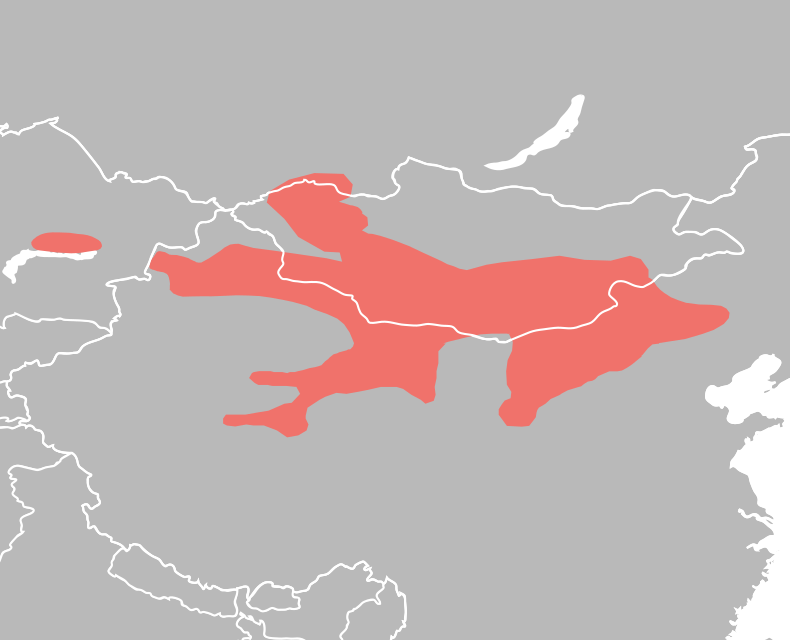
- Cardiocranius paradoxus distribution

= Five-toed pygmy jerboa =

Species of rodent

The five-toed pygmy jerboa (Cardiocranius paradoxus) is a species of rodent in the family Dipodidae. It is monotypic within the genus Cardiocranius. It is found in China, Kazakhstan, and Mongolia.

Its natural habitat is temperate desert. This species is not well known and its population and conservation status are unresolved.

C. paradoxus has adapted to its desert environment by burrowing underground to prevent overheating and promote survival. They use their burrows for food storage and shelter, and, in cold winters, they hibernate in burrows to conserve energy. Burrowing accounts for the five-toed pygmy jerboa's tendency to be nocturnal, as they prefer to forage for food during the night when conditions are less severe.
