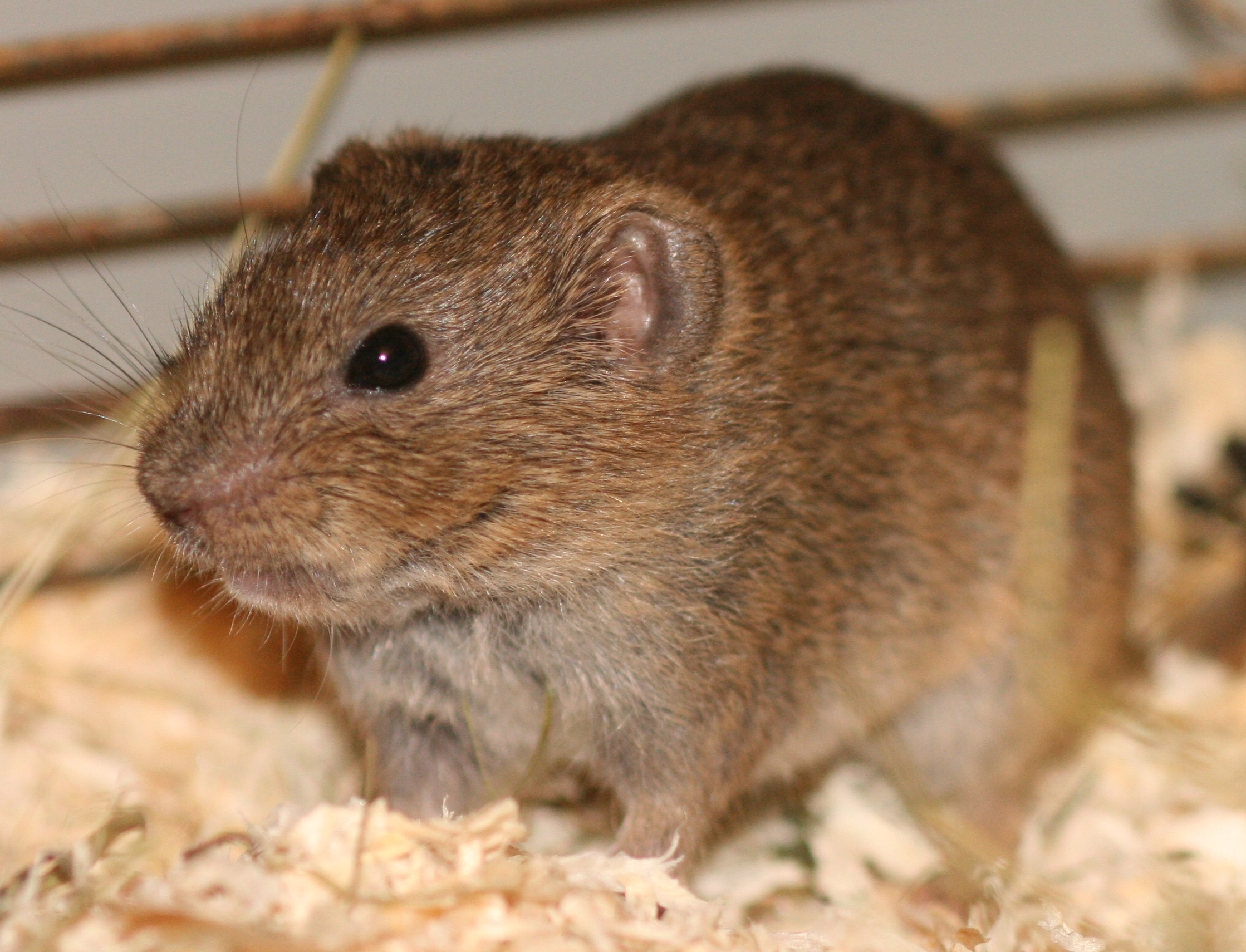

Conservation status
- Least Concern (IUCN 3.1)

Scientific classification
- Kingdom: Animalia
- Phylum: Chordata
- Class: Mammalia
- Order: Rodentia
- Family: Cricetidae
- Subfamily: Arvicolinae
- Genus: Synaptomys
- Species: S. cooperi

Binomial name
- Synaptomys cooperi Baird, 1857
- Southern bog lemming range

= Southern bog lemming =

Species of mammal

The southern bog lemming (Synaptomys cooperi) is a small North American lemming. Its range overlaps with the other species in genus Synaptomys, the northern bog lemming, in southeastern Canada, but extends farther south.

== Description ==
Southern bog lemmings are covered with thick, brownish fur on their backs that ranges in color from reddish to dark brown and have a grizzled appearance. The belly is silver-gray. The shallow-grooved upper incisors and a relatively shorter tail distinguish this species from other rodents. They have relatively large heads and small eyes. The ears barely show through puffy head fur. Southern bog lemmings have four toes and one small, nailed thumb on the forefeet and five toes on the hind feet. Females have six teats, which distinguishes this species from its closest relative, northern bog lemmings, which have eight. They have a large head, short legs, and a short tail which is lighter underneath. Their upper incisors are grooved. They are 13 cm (5.1 in) long with a 2 cm (0.79 in) tail and weigh about 35 g (1.2 oz).

== Range and habitat ==
Southern bog lemmings are found in eastern North America, from southern Quebec and Manitoba in Canada to western Minnesota, to northwestern Georgia, to southwest Kansas, and east to the Atlantic Coast of the United States. This species is more common in deciduous and mixed coniferous–deciduous forests. The grassy openings and edges of these forests, especially where sedges, ferns, and shrubs grow and when the soil is loose and crumbly, are habitats the bog lemming prefers. It also inhabits wetter and drier sites when meadow voles are scarce or absent. The southern bog lemming creates a maze of interconnecting tunnels and runways and builds nests from plant fibers. Summer nests are on the surface of the ground or in a clump of sedges or grasses, but winter nests are usually underground in an enlarged tunnel. These animals are found in mixed forests, wetlands, and grasslands.

== Diet and feeding behavior ==
Fresh vegetation, especially the leaves, stems, seeds heads, and roots of grasses and sedges is the main food of this species. Raspberries, blueberries and other fruits, insects, fungi, and bark form a lesser part of the diet. They cache grasses and sedge stems in underground chambers. They do not hibernate, and live in groups of a few to several dozen individuals. Female lemmings have two or three litters of four to six young in a year. The young are born in a nest in a burrow or concealed in vegetation. Most live less than a year. The range of these animals is thought to be declining in some areas due to loss of wetland habitat.

They are active year-round, mainly at night. They make runways through the surface vegetation and also dig burrows. These animals are often found in small colonies. Lemming populations go through a 3- or 4-year cycle of boom and bust.

== Reproduction ==
Breeding can occur during any time of the year if food is plentiful. The gestation period is 21–23 days. At birth, the pups are blind and without fur. They also have claws at birth. By the end of their first week, young are well furred. They open their eyes at about 12 days of age. They are weaned at 3 weeks. Male southern bog lemmings reach sexual maturity in 5 weeks. Most individuals breed before they reach their maximum size.

== Communication ==
Southern bog lemmings are thought to communicate using scent marking. They also make squeaking vocalizations. Other methods of communication include acoustic, chemical, visual, and tactile.

== Predators ==
Southern bog lemmings have many predators, including owls, hawks, red foxes, gray foxes, domestic dogs, badgers, weasels, snakes, bobcats, and house cats.

Two subspecies have become extinct: Kansas bog lemming (S. c. paludis), and Nebraska bog lemming (S. c. relictus).
