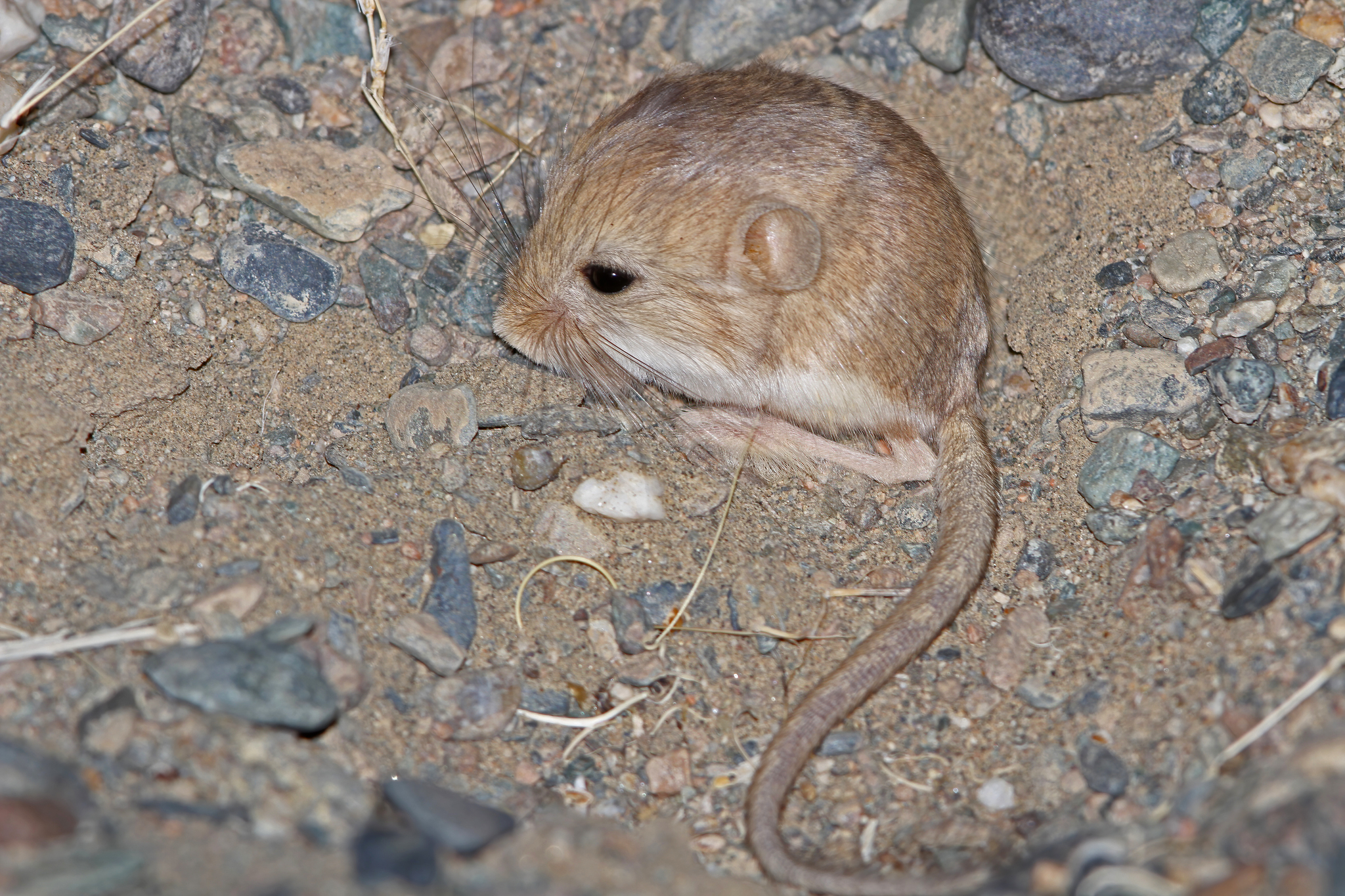
- Salpingotus kozlovi

Scientific classification
- Kingdom: Animalia
- Phylum: Chordata
- Class: Mammalia
- Order: Rodentia
- Family: Dipodidae
- Subfamily: Cardiocraniinae
- Genus: Salpingotus; Vinogradov, 1922

Type species
- Salpingotus kozlovi Vinogradov, 1922

Species
- Salpingotus crassicauda Salpingotus heptneri Salpingotus kozlovi Salpingotus pallidus Salpingotus thomasi
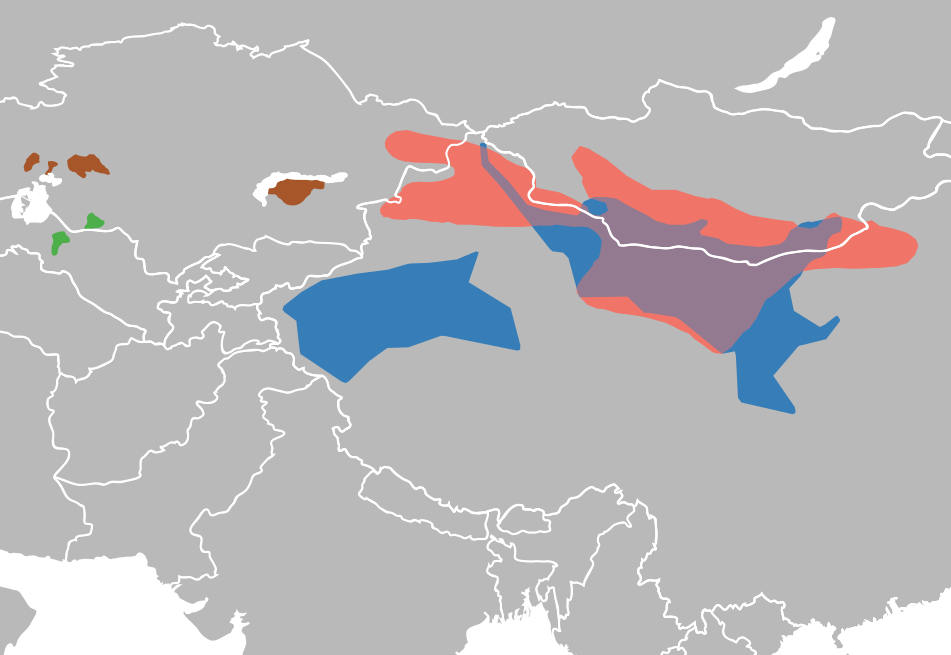
- Salpingotus distribution S. crassicauda in red, S. kozlovi in blue, S. heptneri in green, S. pallidus in brown

= Salpingotus =

Genus of rodents

Salpingotus is a genus of rodents in the family Dipodidae. It contains the following species:

- Genus Salpingotus
  - Subgenus Anguistodontus
    - Thick-tailed pygmy jerboa (Salpingotus crassicauda)
  - Subgenus Prosalpingotus
    - Heptner's pygmy jerboa (Salpingotus heptneri)
    - Pale pygmy jerboa (Salpingotus pallidus)
    - Thomas's pygmy jerboa (Salpingotus thomasi)
  - Subgenus Salpingotus
    - Kozlov's pygmy jerboa (Salpingotus kozlovi)
