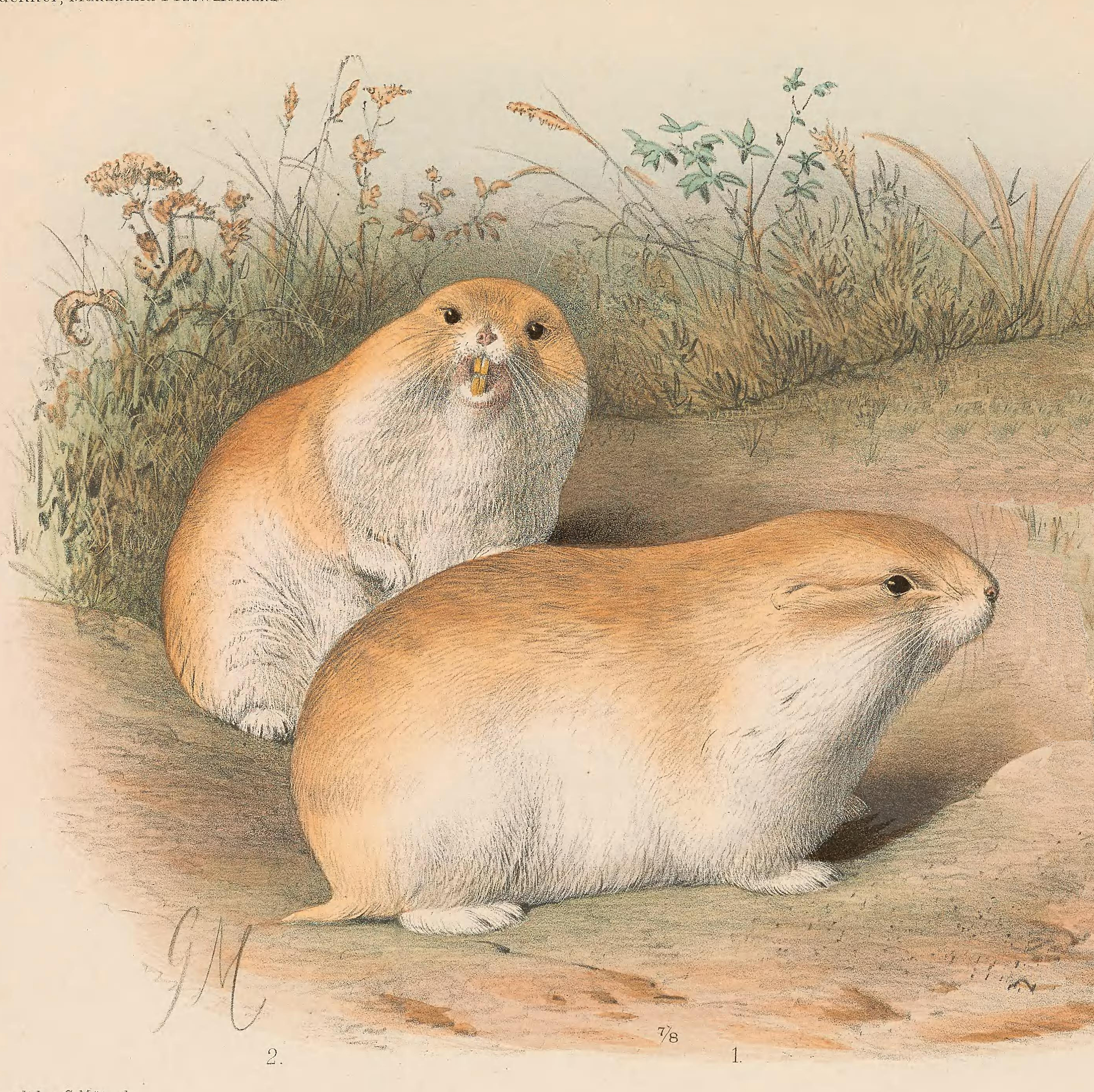

Conservation status
- Least Concern (IUCN 3.1)

Scientific classification
- Domain: Eukaryota
- Kingdom: Animalia
- Phylum: Chordata
- Class: Mammalia
- Order: Rodentia
- Family: Cricetidae
- Subfamily: Arvicolinae
- Genus: Eolagurus
- Species: E. przewalskii

Binomial name
- Eolagurus przewalskii (Büchner, 1889)

= Przewalski's steppe lemming =

Species of mammal

Przewalski's steppe lemming (Eolagurus przewalskii) is a species of rodent in the family Cricetidae. It is found in China and Mongolia.
