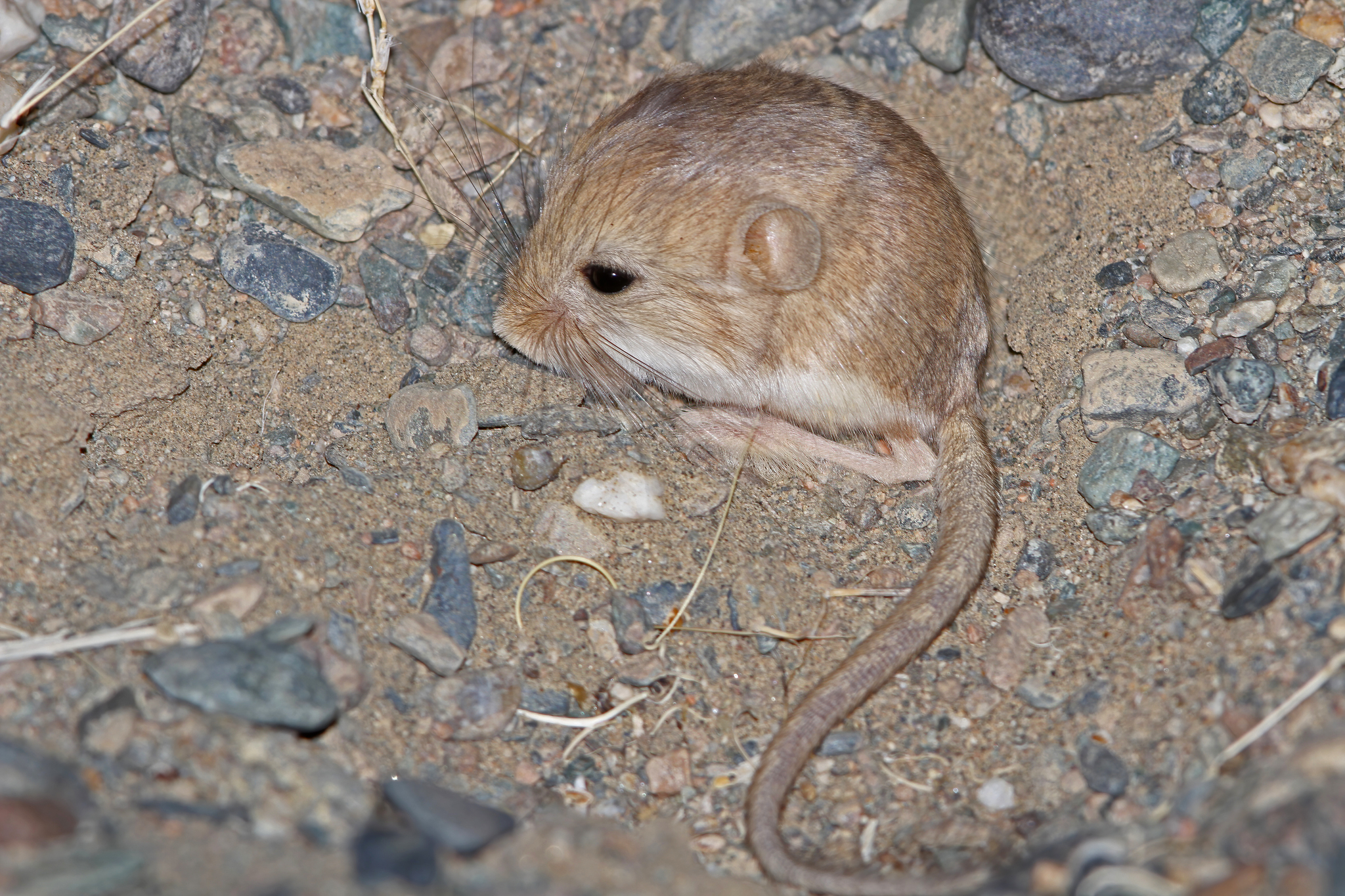

Conservation status
- Least Concern (IUCN 3.1)

Scientific classification
- Kingdom: Animalia
- Phylum: Chordata
- Class: Mammalia
- Order: Rodentia
- Family: Dipodidae
- Genus: Salpingotus
- Subgenus: Salpingotus; Vinogradov, 1922
- Species: S. kozlovi

Binomial name
- Salpingotus kozlovi Vinogradov, 1922
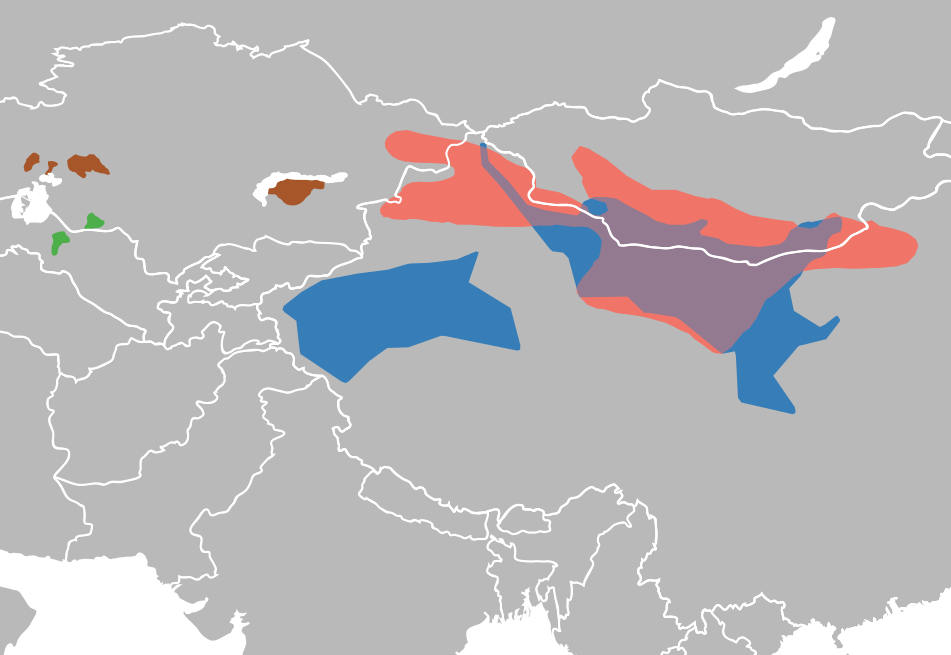
- Salpingotus distribution S. kozlovi in blue

= Kozlov's pygmy jerboa =

Species of rodent

Kozlov's pygmy jerboa (Salpingotus kozlovi) is a species of rodent in the family Dipodidae. It is found in northwestern China and southern and eastern Mongolia. Its natural habitat is temperate desert.

== Description ==
Kozlov's pygmy jerboa is a very small rodent with a relatively large head and a very long tail; it has a head-and-body length of 43 to 56 mm (1.7 to 2.2 in) and a tail length of 119 to 126 mm (4.7 to 5.0 in) and its weight is between 7 and 12 g (0.2 and 0.4 oz). The fur is silky, the upper parts are sandy-grey with the bases of the hairs yellowish-grey, the flanks are rather paler and the underparts white or yellowish. The hind feet have three toes and dense pads of long hair on the soles. The tail is scantily clad with long hairs and has a tufted, dark-coloured tip.

== Distribution and habitat ==
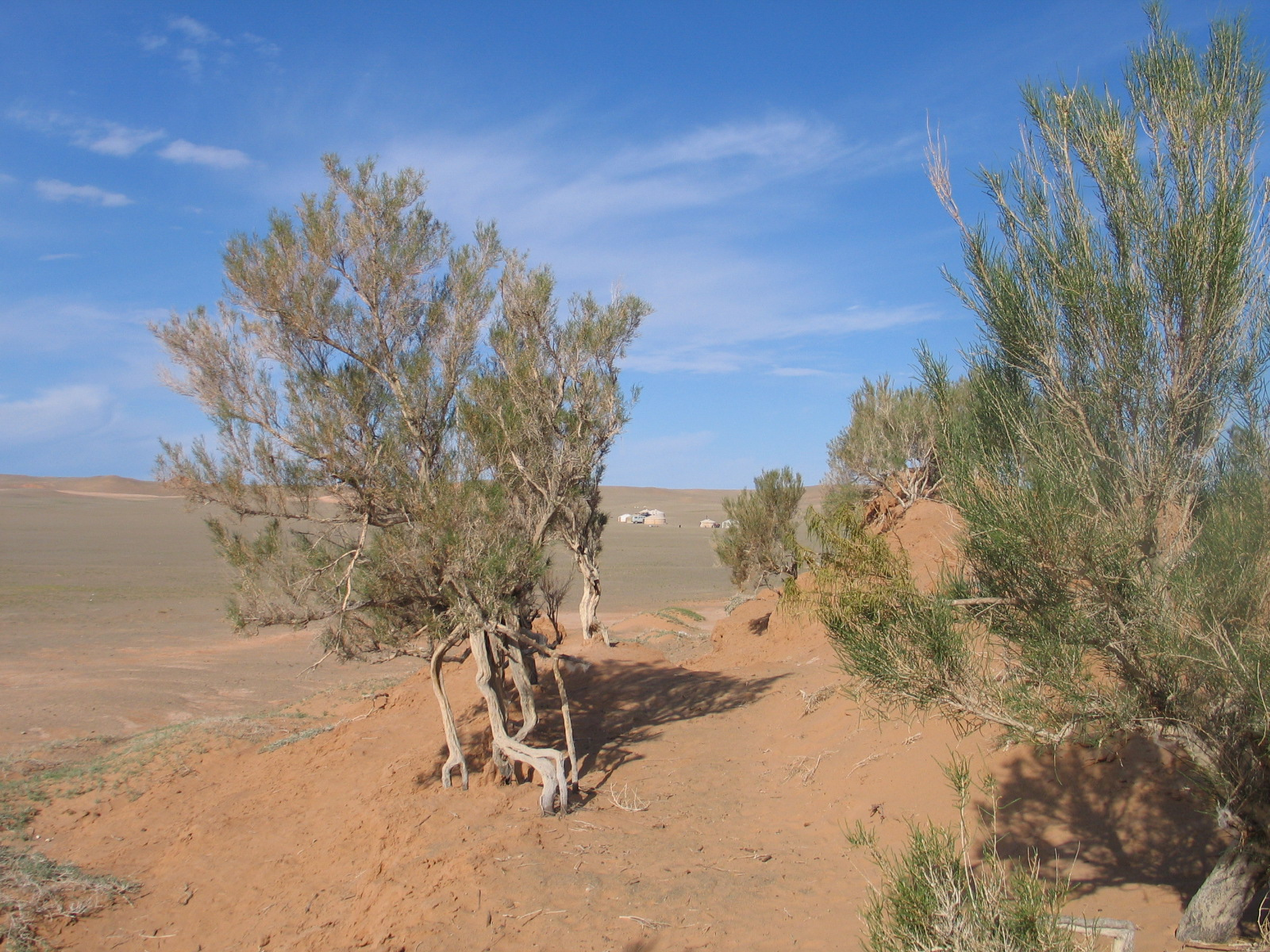
Typical habitat with saxaul

Kozlov's pygmy jerboa is native to southern and eastern Mongolia, and northwestern China, in the provinces of Gansu, Nei Mongol, Ningxia, Shaanxi, Xinjiang. Its natural habitat is sandy desert and semi-desert, often with scrubby saxaul (Haloxylon ammodendron) and tamarix.

== Ecology ==
The ecology of Kozlov's pygmy jerboa is not well known. It lives in a burrow and is mainly nocturnal, emerging at dusk to feed on seeds, green plant matter, spiders and insects. Breeding takes place in April and May and the litter size averages three to five young.

== Status ==
Kozlov's pygmy jerboa has a wide range and is a common species in suitable habitat. The population trend is not known but it is presumed to have a large total population and is present in several protected areas. No specific threats to this jerboa have been identified, and the International Union for Conservation of Nature has assessed its conservation status as being of "least concern".
