= Heptner's pygmy jerboa =

Conservation status
- Data Deficient (IUCN 3.1)

Scientific classification
- Kingdom: Animalia
- Phylum: Chordata
- Class: Mammalia
- Order: Rodentia
- Family: Dipodidae
- Genus: Salpingotus
- Subgenus: Prosalpingotus
- Species: S. heptneri

Binomial name
- Salpingotus heptneri Vorontsov & Smirnov, 1969
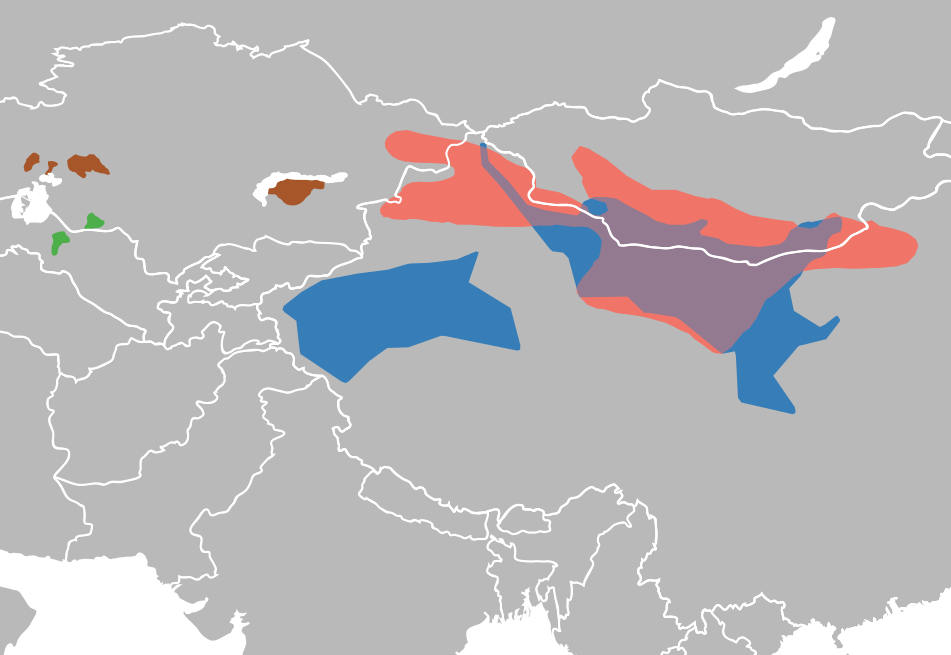
- Salpingotus distribution S. heptneri in green

Species of rodent

Heptner's pygmy jerboa (Salpingotus heptneri) is a species of rodent in the family Dipodidae. It is native to temperate deserts in Kazakhstan, Uzbekistan, and possibly Russia. The species is named after Vladimir Geptner.
