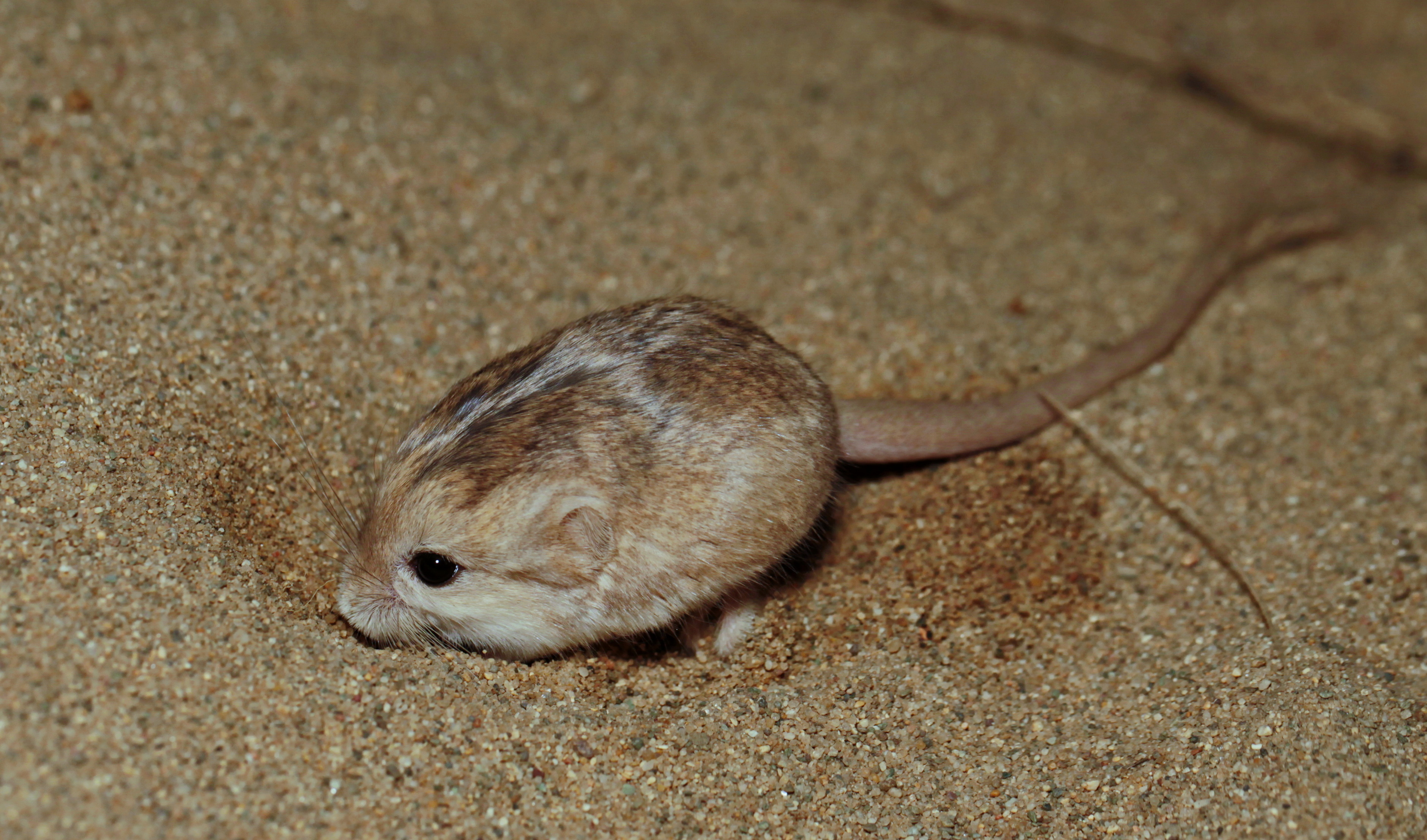

Conservation status
- Least Concern (IUCN 3.1)

Scientific classification
- Kingdom: Animalia
- Phylum: Chordata
- Class: Mammalia
- Order: Rodentia
- Family: Dipodidae
- Genus: Salpingotus
- Subgenus: Anguistodontus; Vorontsov & Shenbrot, 1984
- Species: S. crassicauda

Binomial name
- Salpingotus crassicauda Vinogradov, 1924
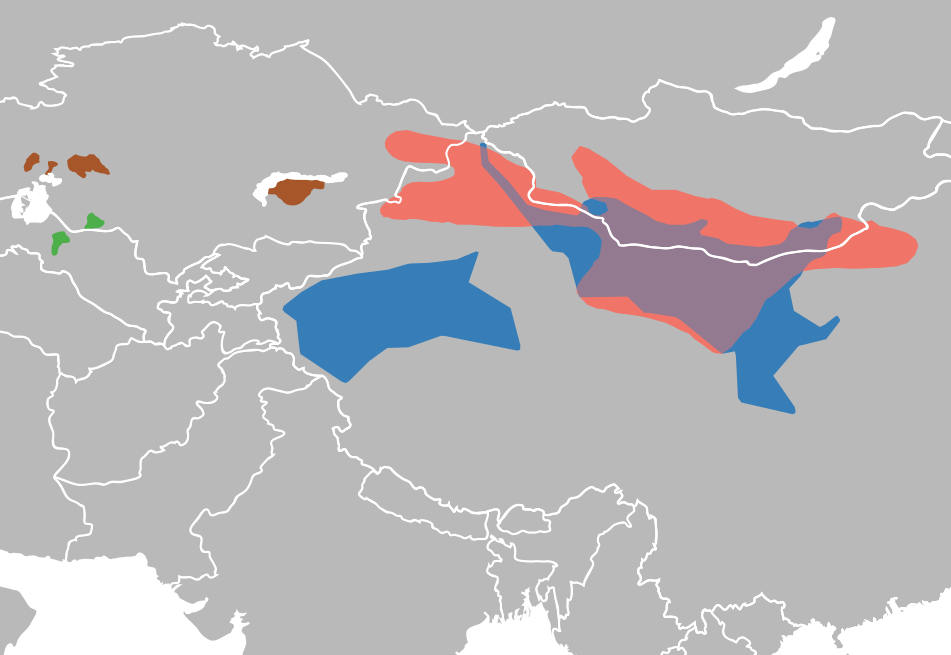
- Salpingotus distribution S. crassicauda in red

= Thick-tailed pygmy jerboa =

Species of rodent

The thick-tailed pygmy jerboa (Salpingotus crassicauda) is a species of rodent in the family Dipodidae. It is found in China, Kazakhstan, and Mongolia. Its natural habitats are temperate grassland and temperate desert. It is threatened by habitat loss. It is listed by the IUCN as being "least concern".

== Description ==
This species grows to a head-and-body length of around 45 to 60 mm (1.8 to 2.4 in) with a slightly longer tail. The head is large and the eyes small, the ears are short and tubular and the tail may have a thickening near the base where fat is deposited. These jerboas get most of their water intake from the food that they consume; however, they will drink water if they can find it.

== Behaviour ==
The thick-tailed pygmy jerboa is a solitary nocturnal animal. It has a permanent burrow with many passages which may extend for 3 m (10 ft). The entrances are sealed with loose plugs of sand and if the jerboa is spotted in the open by a predator it attempts to bury itself in the sand. Predators include owls, mountain weasels (Mustela altaica), marbled polecats (Vormela peregusna) and red foxes (Vulpes vulpes). This jerboa feeds on small invertebrates such as grasshoppers and spiders and also some vegetable matter, mostly seeds. Reproduction takes place in the spring and summer when litters of two to five young are born.

== Status ==
The thick-tailed pygmy jerboa varies in its spatial distribution and its populations are subject to large fluctuations. Threats it faces include predators, droughts, overgrazing of its habitat, destruction of its burrows and road kill. Insufficient evidence is available for the International Union for Conservation of Nature to assess its conservation status so it is listed as "data deficient".
