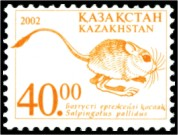

Conservation status
- Data Deficient (IUCN 3.1)

Scientific classification
- Kingdom: Animalia
- Phylum: Chordata
- Class: Mammalia
- Order: Rodentia
- Family: Dipodidae
- Genus: Salpingotus
- Subgenus: Prosalpingotus
- Species: S. pallidus

Binomial name
- Salpingotus pallidus Vorontsov & Shenbrot, 1984
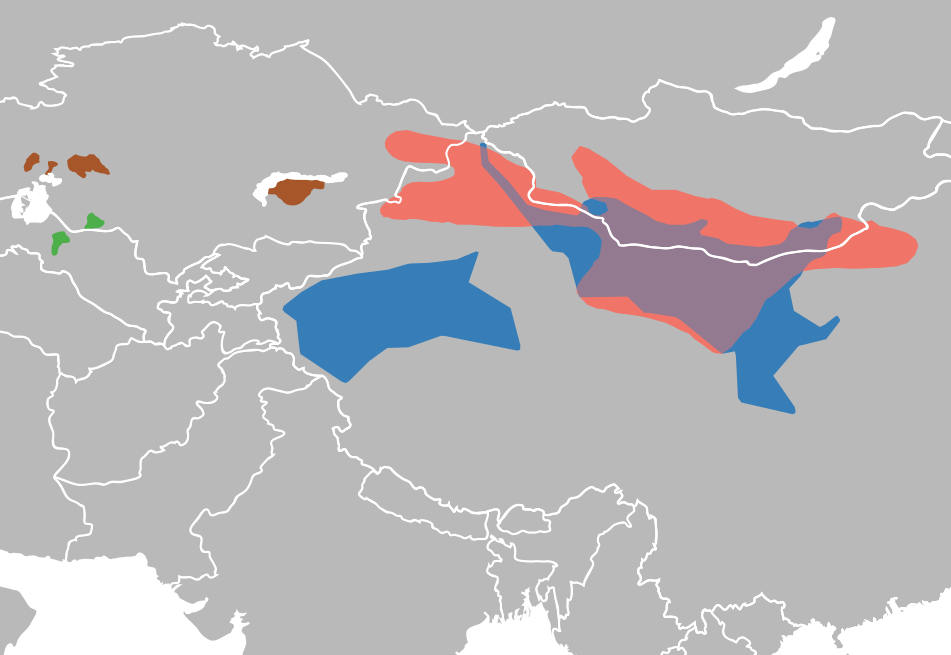
- Salpingotus distribution S. pallidus in brown

= Pale pygmy jerboa =

Species of rodent

The pale pygmy jerboa or pallid pygmy jerboa (Salpingotus pallidus) is a species of rodent in the family Dipodidae endemic to Kazakhstan.
