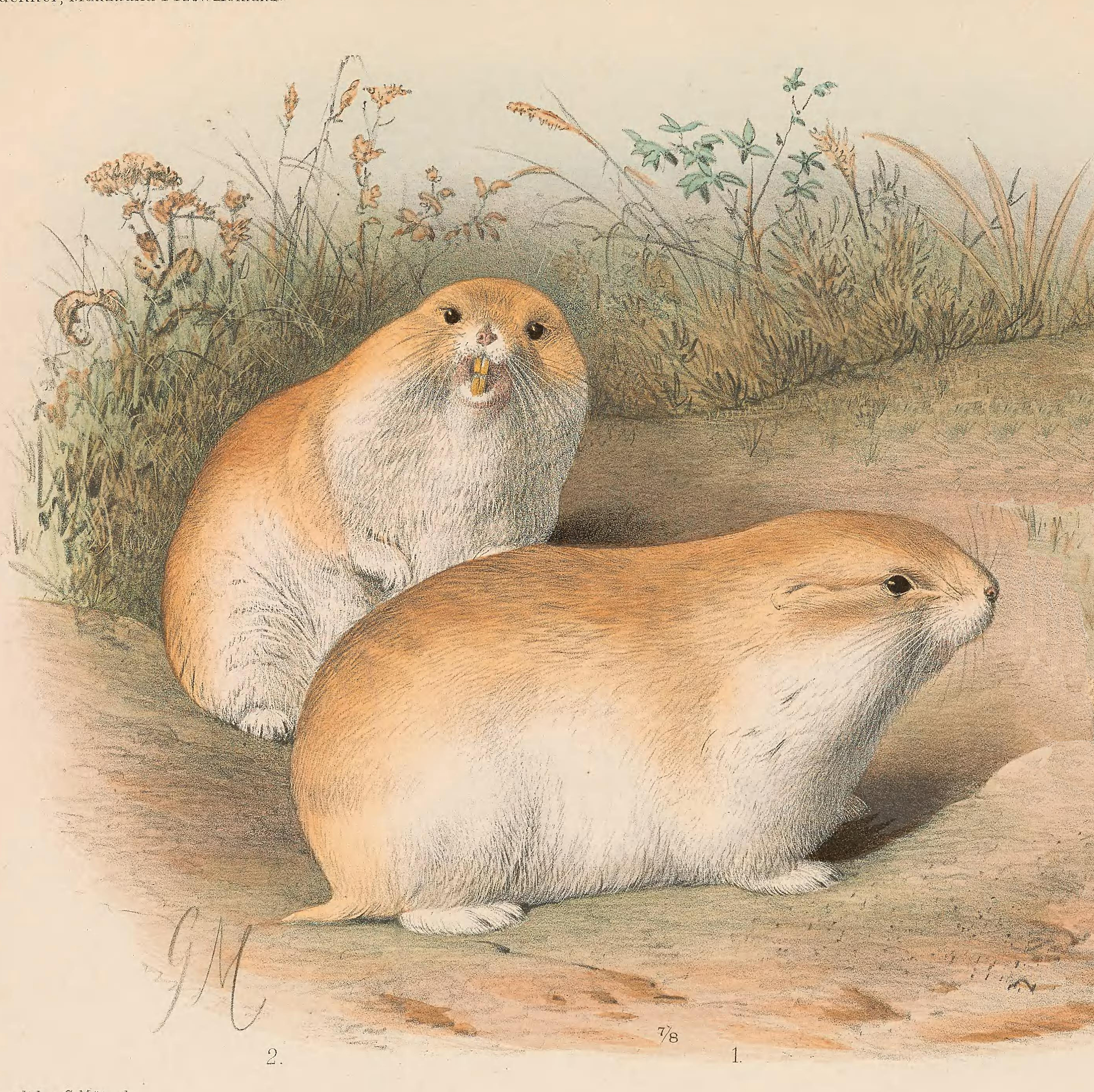
- Eolagurus przewalskii

Scientific classification
- Kingdom: Animalia
- Phylum: Chordata
- Class: Mammalia
- Infraclass: Placentalia
- Order: Rodentia
- Family: Cricetidae
- Subfamily: Arvicolinae
- Tribe: Lagurini
- Genus: Eolagurus; Argyropulo, 1946

Type species
- Georychus luteus Eversmann, 1840

Species
- Eolagurus luteus Eolagurus przewalskii

= Eolagurus =

Eolagurus Temporal range: Middle Pleistocene to Recent

Genus of rodents

Eolagurus is a genus of rodent in the family Cricetidae. It contains the following species:

- Yellow steppe lemming (Eolagurus luteus)
- Przewalski's steppe lemming (Eolagurus przewalskii)
