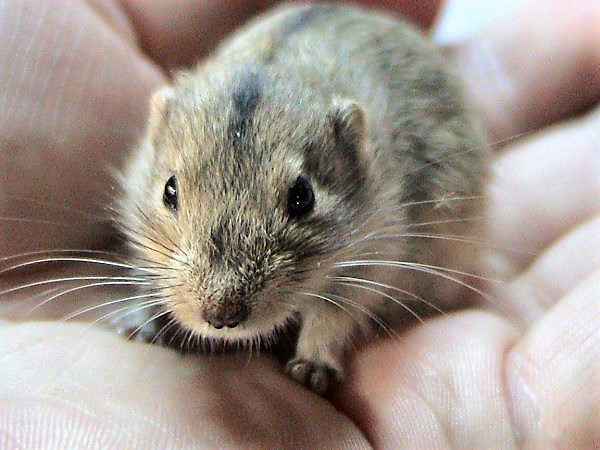

Conservation status
- Least Concern (IUCN 2.3)

Scientific classification
- Kingdom: Animalia
- Phylum: Chordata
- Class: Mammalia
- Order: Rodentia
- Family: Cricetidae
- Subfamily: Arvicolinae
- Genus: Lagurus
- Species: L. lagurus

Binomial name
- Lagurus lagurus (Pallas, 1773)

= Steppe lemming =

Species of mammal

The steppe lemming or steppe vole (Lagurus lagurus) is a small rodent. It is described as somewhat similar in appearance to the Norway lemming (Lemmus lemmus). It is more active at night, however, it is not entirely nocturnal. The steppe lemming's diet consists of shoots and leaves. In the wild, it is found in steppes and semiarid environments in Russia, Ukraine, Kazakhstan, northwestern China, and western Mongolia. Fossil remains of this species have been found in areas as far west as Great Britain.

== Description ==
The steppe lemming's body length is up to 12 cm with a tail of 2 cm. It is light-grey and plump. It has small ears and eyes and the fur is brownish-grey with a black dorsal stripe. It weighs around 30 g.

== Distribution ==
This lemming is found in steppe, forest-steppe and semidesert parts of western Mongolia, northwest China, many parts of the former USSR, Kazakhstan, Ukraine, the southern and middle Ural, and western and eastern Siberia.

== Ecology ==
The steppe lemming is a colonial species. It digs burrows. During the day, it is active, though only emerges from its burrow for short periods. It eats different parts of plants. This includes seeds. It reaches sexual maturity at the age of six weeks. It can produce up to six broods in a year, with five or six young in each. Under the correct conditions, reproduction continues throughout the year. The amount of steppe lemmings differs based on the climate and resources available. Migrations are observed during years of mass outbreaks.

== Steppe lemmings as pets ==
It is the most common domestic vole, being particularly well known in Europe. (In the US and Canada, it is still considered an exotic animal.)

In captivity, they can live over two years, but they are usually mistreated with small cages (A suitable space larger than average is best for a colony of rodents) and improper diets. Although the steppe lemming is social by nature and should not be held in captivity alone, if a colony of steppe lemmings is held together for a long period of time (two to three months) they may become hostile to each other (mainly to the subordinate members of the colony). If there is only one separate nesting area, two entrances or exits should be placed, due to the attack style of the more impetuous lemmings. They also tend to be very territorial animals, so a low male population is best in captivity. Overall, three to eight steppe lemmings in one cage or aquarium is ideal, with no more than one male for every two or three females.

Standard rodent food containing bits of dried fruit is not appropriate; as their natural diets do not contain much sugar, steppe lemmings are somewhat diabetic, and become sick or even die from overdosing on sugar. A sugar-free, no molasses food that does not contain dried fruit and little sunflower and other oily seeds should be used; laboratory rodent foods may be a cheap alternative. Additionally, steppe lemmings need grass and other leafy greens, such as alfalfa, to thrive.

Grass gathered outdoors may harbor parasites and toxins and should not be used unless gathered from meadows away from inhabited areas, roads and not frequented by dogs or used for grazing. No matter where any grass or moss has been obtained, and even if it is only intended for bedding, it should be kept in a freezer for three days to eliminate parasites such as lice and mites.

Clean water should be always available; the amount actually drunk varies with the food consumed. Willow twigs need to be provided for abrading the continuously growing teeth. Lemmings can drink from a shallow dish, but since they typically track their bedding into the water, a bottle with a ball valve is better.

Lemmings enjoy any kind of running or climbing; however, as their habitat is essentially flat and rather featureless terrain, they have a poor sense of height and danger, so their enclosures should not be high enough to allow them to fall more than 10–15cm and should, of course, be lined with wood chips and hay. An exercise wheel is the best way to keep the animals busy and trim, and if the wheels afford enough space, they will often race in it together. (However, fights can often develop around wheels - with males, particularly, it is helpful to have several wheels, perhaps even one for each lemming.)

=== Aggression ===
==== Motives for fighting ====
In general, steppe lemmings are friendly animals and prefer to live in colonies. Even small groups of males (preferably from the same litter) can live quite peacefully. However, males do tend to be territorial and a mature alpha male will nearly always attack a stranger and will often mistreat other members of his own litter, particularly if the nest is overcrowded. A large, well-filled terrarium (about 5–10cm wood chips covered by about 10 cm of hay) can allow a group to live far more peacefully; altercations should be expected in smaller spaces with little bedding.

Fights (as well as unintentional accidents) can also occur in and around exercise wheels.

Once a male has become aggressive - even with an outsider - he should be considered dangerous, watched very closely and - if possible - be neutered and placed with a group of females. Although neutering a lemming is a difficult operation typically attempted only by veterinary hospitals, it is possible. A neutered alpha male will generally not become less aggressive toward other males.

==== Fights, wounds and necessary precautions ====
The aggressor will try to trap the defending lemming in a corner and then attack with his teeth and short claws. Excited chirps, chattering and running typically accompany a fight - in most cases, the whole colony will be disturbed. (While activity of this kind is amusing for new owners, it should be observed very carefully, since peaceful lemming colonies are much quieter than ones characterized by aggressive behavior.)

Since lemmings like to nest in small, narrow enclosures (like boxes the size of a fist), it is important for the enclosure have a second exit, so the defender can escape into another part of the terrarium. Lemming fights sometimes leave no exterior signs of violence, but can cause fatal internal bleeding. More often, fights result in lacerations, often around the hind legs, bottom and genitals.

Lemmings hurt in a fight should be placed in terraria or cages separate from the aggressor as soon as possible. Also, their natural tendency to scratch and lick at wounds can cause slow healing. A veterinarian may prescribe antibiotics and infection retardants to help an injured lemming, generally at reasonable costs. While it can be very difficult to convince an injured lemming to drink its medicated drops or eat food laced with medicine, a good trick is to place drops of medicine on the lemming's nose. Through licking itself clean, the lemming will ingest the medicine.
