= Yellow steppe lemming =

Conservation status
- Least Concern (IUCN 3.1)

Scientific classification
- Kingdom: Animalia
- Phylum: Chordata
- Class: Mammalia
- Order: Rodentia
- Family: Cricetidae
- Subfamily: Arvicolinae
- Genus: Eolagurus
- Species: E. luteus

Binomial name
- Eolagurus luteus (Eversmann, 1840)

Species of rodent

The yellow steppe lemming (Eolagurus luteus) is a species of rodent in the family Cricetidae. It is found in China, Kazakhstan, and Mongolia. Its natural habitat is temperate desert.
