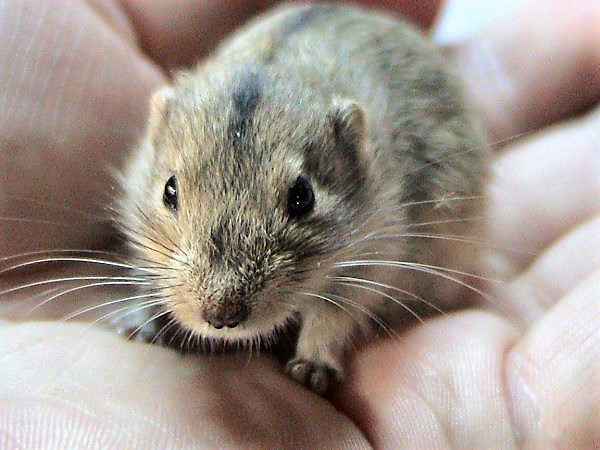
- Steppe lemming (Lagurus lagurus)

Scientific classification
- Domain: Eukaryota
- Kingdom: Animalia
- Phylum: Chordata
- Class: Mammalia
- Order: Rodentia
- Family: Cricetidae
- Subfamily: Arvicolinae
- Tribe: Lagurini
- Genus: Lagurus; Gloger, 1841

Type species
- Mus lagurus Pallas, 1773

Species
- See text.

= Lagurus (rodent) =

Lagurus Temporal range: Late Pliocene to Recent

Genus of rodents

Lagurus is a genus in the subfamily Arvicolinae (voles, lemmings, and related species). Lagurus includes a single living species, the steppe lemming (Lagurus lagurus) of central Eurasia. The North American sagebrush vole (Lemmiscus curtatus) has also been included in Lagurus, but is likely not closely related. The earliest fossils of Lagurus, allocated to Lagurus arankae, appear in the Late Pliocene. Two other fossil species, Lagurus pannonicus and Lagurus transiens, are thought to be part of a lineage that led to the living steppe lemming.

== Literature cited ==
- Chaline, J., Brunet-Lecomte, P., Montuire, S., Viriot, L. and Courant, F. 1999. Anatomy of the arvicoline radiation (Rodentia): palaeogeographical, palaeoecological history and evolutionary data. Annales Zoologici Fennici 36:239–267.
- McKenna, M.C. and Bell, S.K. 1997. Classification of Mammals: Above the species level. New York: Columbia University Press, 631 pp. ISBN 978-0-231-11013-6
- Musser, G.G. and Carleton, M.D. 2005. Superfamily Muroidea. Pp. 894–1531 in Wilson, D.E. and Reeder, D.M. (eds.). Mammal Species of the World: a taxonomic and geographic reference. 3rd ed. Baltimore: The Johns Hopkins University Press, 2 vols., 2142 pp. ISBN 978-0-8018-8221-0
