= Ganzu vole =

Conservation status
- Least Concern (IUCN 3.1)

Scientific classification
- Kingdom: Animalia
- Phylum: Chordata
- Class: Mammalia
- Order: Rodentia
- Family: Cricetidae
- Subfamily: Arvicolinae
- Genus: Caryomys
- Species: C. eva

Binomial name
- Caryomys eva (Thomas, 1911)

Synonyms
- Eothenomys eva

Species of rodent

The Ganzu vole, Eva's red-backed vole, Eva's vole, Gansu vole, or Taozhou vole (Caryomys eva) is a species of rodent in the family Cricetidae. It is found in mountain forests in China. The IUCN has assessed it as being of "least concern".

== Description ==
The Ganzu vole grows to a head and body length of 83 to 100 mm (3.3 to 3.9 in) with a moderate-length tail some 46 to 60 mm (1.8 to 2.4 in) long. The dorsal fur is dark reddish-brown and the underparts are dark grey, the guard hairs having buff-coloured tips. The upper surfaces of the hands and feet are dark brown. The tail is dark brown above and paler brown below but not obviously bicoloured as is the case in the closely related Kolan vole (Caryomys inez). The two species are also differentiated by the arrangement of the cusps on their molars.

== Distribution and habitat ==
The Ganzu vole is endemic to mountainous regions of China where it is found in the provinces of Sichuan, Gansu, Shaanxi, Hubei, Qinghai and Ningxia. Its typical habitat is moist forest with an abundance of mosses and its altitudinal range is 2,600 to 4,000 metres (8,530 to 13,120 ft) above sea level. It seems to occupy the ecological niche that red-backed voles (Eothenomys sp.) occupy at lower altitudes.

== Ecology ==
The Ganzu vole feeds on plant material including buds, leaves, shoots, grasses, seeds and bark.

== Status ==
The Ganzu vole has a very wide range and is presumed to have a large total population. No specific threats have been identified for this species and there are several protected areas within its range. Although the population trend is unknown, it is unlikely that the species is declining at a fast enough rate to justify listing it in a threatened category so the International Union for Conservation of Nature has assessed its conservation status as being of "least concern".
