= Caryomys =

Scientific classification
- Domain: Eukaryota
- Kingdom: Animalia
- Phylum: Chordata
- Class: Mammalia
- Order: Rodentia
- Family: Cricetidae
- Subfamily: Arvicolinae
- Tribe: Clethrionomyini
- Genus: Caryomys; Thomas, 1911

Type species
- Microtus (Eothenomys) inez Thomas, 1908

Species
- Caryomys eva Caryomys inez

Genus of rodents

Caryomys is a genus of rodent in the family Cricetidae. The genus contains the following species:

- Ganzu vole (Caryomys eva)
- Kolan vole (Caryomys inez)
