= Kolan vole =

Conservation status
- Least Concern (IUCN 3.1)

Scientific classification
- Kingdom: Animalia
- Phylum: Chordata
- Class: Mammalia
- Order: Rodentia
- Family: Cricetidae
- Subfamily: Arvicolinae
- Genus: Caryomys
- Species: C. inez

Binomial name
- Caryomys inez (Thomas, 1908)

Species of rodent

The Kolan vole, Inez's red-backed vole or Inez's vole (Caryomys inez) is a species of rodent in the family Cricetidae. It is found only in China. Two subspecies have been recognized, Caryomys inez inez from the northern part of its range and Caryomys inez nux from the southern part.

== Description ==
The Kolan vole has a head and body length of about 90 mm (3.5 in) with a tail 32 to 44 mm (1.3 to 1.7 in) long. The ears are small and rounded and hardly project from the pelage. The dorsal fur is a uniform dull buffish brown and the underparts are pale buff. The upper surfaces of hands and feet are brown. The upper surface of the tail is dark brown and the underside is pale brown giving it a bicolour appearance.

== Distribution and habitat ==
The Kolan vole is endemic to China where it is known in the provinces of Shaanxi, Shanxi, Anhui, Sichuan, Gansu, Henan, Ningxia, Hebei and Hubei. It is found at altitudes of between 500 and 2,000 metres (1,600 and 6,600 ft) above sea level and its typical habitat is thick tangled undergrowth in ravines and gullies where it burrows in loose soil.

== Behaviour ==
Little is known of the reproduction of this species but it is believed to breed between March and October. Females have four nipples and one that was trapped was found to be carrying two embryos.

== Status ==
The Kolan vole has a wide distribution and is presumed to have a large total population. No specific threats have been identified for this vole and there are several protected areas within its range. Although the population trend is unknown, the International Union for Conservation of Nature has assessed its conservation status as being of "least concern".
