= Kachin red-backed vole =

Conservation status
- Least Concern (IUCN 3.1)

Scientific classification
- Kingdom: Animalia
- Phylum: Chordata
- Class: Mammalia
- Infraclass: Placentalia
- Order: Rodentia
- Family: Cricetidae
- Subfamily: Arvicolinae
- Genus: Eothenomys
- Species: E. cachinus

Binomial name
- Eothenomys cachinus (Thomas, 1921)
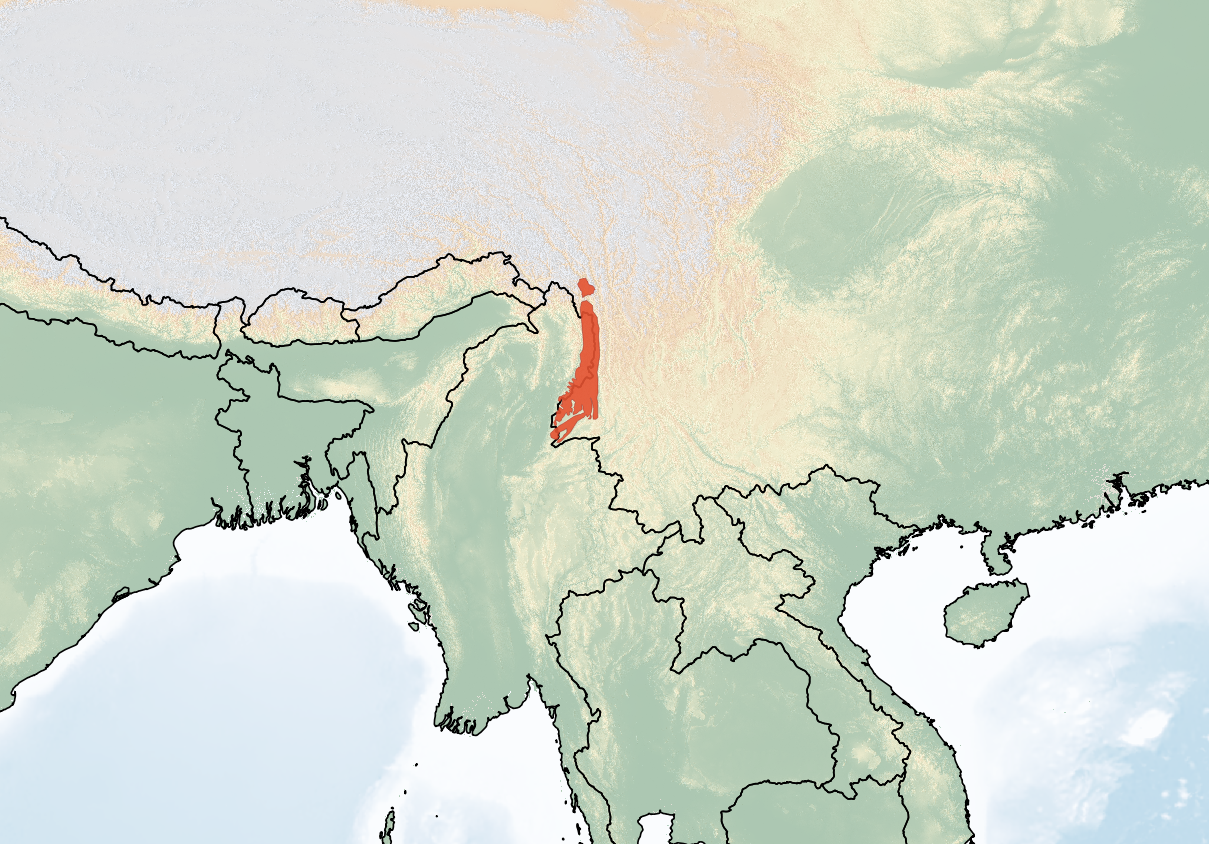

Species of rodent

The Kachin red-backed vole (Eothenomys cachinus) is a species of rodent in the family Cricetidae. It is found in Kachin State in northern Burma & Yunnan State in southwestern China. Although described as a species by Thomas in 1921, it was subsequently included as a subspecies of either E. melanogaster or E. miletus. Comparisons of a 1941 sampling showed that E. cachinus was indeed a separate species.

Adults of the species are large-bodied, with longer tails than any other member of the genus Eothenomys (between 43 and 61mm) and thick, soft and long fur, the upper parts being brown and the lower parts grey. Compared to E. miletus the skull is shorter and not as wide, with a significantly lower profile.
