= Ward's red-backed vole =

Conservation status
- Near Threatened (IUCN 3.1)

Scientific classification
- Kingdom: Animalia
- Phylum: Chordata
- Class: Mammalia
- Order: Rodentia
- Family: Cricetidae
- Subfamily: Arvicolinae
- Genus: Eothenomys
- Species: E. wardi

Binomial name
- Eothenomys wardi (Thomas, 1912)

Species of rodent

The Ward's red-backed vole (Eothenomys wardi) is a species of rodent in the family Cricetidae. It is found in China, specifically the north-western area of Yunnan Province. It is sometimes considered a subspecies of Eothenomys chinensis, but most zoologists consider it to be a separate species due to the noticeably shorter tail and hind feet.
