= Southwest China vole =

Conservation status
- Least Concern (IUCN 3.1)

Scientific classification
- Kingdom: Animalia
- Phylum: Chordata
- Class: Mammalia
- Order: Rodentia
- Family: Cricetidae
- Subfamily: Arvicolinae
- Genus: Eothenomys
- Species: E. custos

Binomial name
- Eothenomys custos (Thomas, 1912)

Species of rodent

The Southwest China vole (Eothenomys custos), or Southwest China red-backed vole, is a species of rodent in the family Cricetidae. It is found only in Yunnan and Sichuan, China. It occurs in Cangshan Erhai Nature Reserve.
