= Yulungshan vole =

Conservation status
- Data Deficient (IUCN 3.1)

Scientific classification
- Kingdom: Animalia
- Phylum: Chordata
- Class: Mammalia
- Order: Rodentia
- Family: Cricetidae
- Subfamily: Arvicolinae
- Genus: Eothenomys
- Species: E. proditor

Binomial name
- Eothenomys proditor Hinton, 1923

Species of rodent

The Yulungshan vole, Yulong Chinese vole, Yulongxuen Chinese vole, or Yulongxuen red-backed vole (Eothenomys proditor) is a species of rodent in the family Cricetidae, endemic to Jade Dragon Snow Mountain in the Sichuan–Yunnan border region of China.
