= Chaotung vole =

Chaotung Vole

Conservation status
- Least Concern (IUCN 3.1)

Scientific classification
- Domain: Eukaryota
- Kingdom: Animalia
- Phylum: Chordata
- Class: Mammalia
- Order: Rodentia
- Family: Cricetidae
- Subfamily: Arvicolinae
- Genus: Eothenomys
- Species: E. olitor

Binomial name
- Eothenomys olitor (Thomas, 1911)

Species of rodent

The Chaotung vole (Eothenomys olitor), also known as the black-eared red-backed vole, is a species of rodent in the family Cricetidae. It is found only in Yunnan, Sichuan, and Guizhou provinces of south-central China.

It inhabits montane forests from 1,800 to 3,350 metres elevation.
