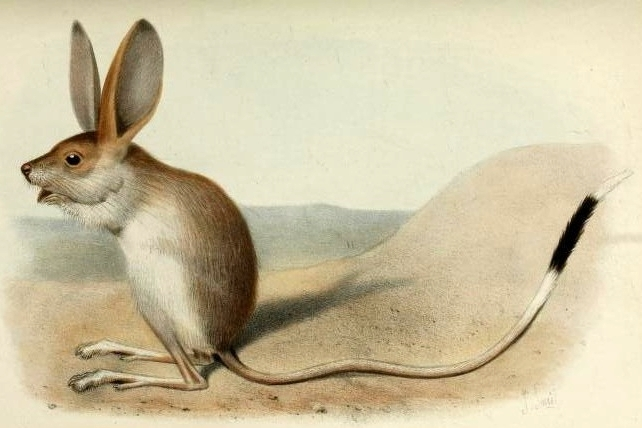

Conservation status
- Least Concern (IUCN 3.1)

Scientific classification
- Kingdom: Animalia
- Phylum: Chordata
- Class: Mammalia
- Order: Rodentia
- Family: Dipodidae
- Subfamily: Euchoreutinae; Lyon, 1901
- Genus: Euchoreutes; W. L. Sclater, 1891
- Species: E. naso

Binomial name
- Euchoreutes naso W. L. Sclater, 1891

= Long-eared jerboa =

Species of rodent

The long-eared jerboa (Euchoreutes naso) is a nocturnal mouse-like rodent with a long tail, long hind legs for jumping, and exceptionally large ears. It is distinct enough that authorities consider it to be the only member of both its genus, Euchoreutes, and subfamily, Euchoreutinae.

Long-eared jerboas are found in the Palearctic ecozone. The specific palearctic ecozone areas they are found in are southernmost Mongolia to the Takla-Makan Desert, Mengxin, Aerijin Mountain, and Qinghai-Tibet Plateau regions of north western China. Long-eared jerboas in most cases are nocturnal, The long-eared jerboa's fur according to the book 100 animals to see before they die "is reddish yellow to pale russet with white underparts." Very little is known about the species.

== Description ==
The long-eared jerboa's head and body length measures 70 to 90 mm (2.8 to 3.5 in) while its tail is double this size, between 150 and 162 mm (5.9 and 6.4 in). Like its disproportionately long tail, its hind feet are also large, helping it to jump high, measuring between 40 and 46 mm (1.6 and 1.8 in). It weighs 24 to 38 g (0.85 to 1.34 oz). Long-eared jerboas usually eat insects. They use sound to locate and capture them by performing fast leaps into the air. According to animal diversity web, "The two lateral digits are shorter than the three central ones. The central metatarsals are fused for a small distance. The feet are covered with tufts of bristly hairs. Long-eared jerboas have ears that are 1/3 longer than their heads. The incisors are thin and white. A small premolar can be found on each side of the upper jaw. Females have eight mammae." Their fur is light reddish/brown with a white underside. Their tails are covered in fine hairs the same color as their body and have a black and white tuft on the end. Telemetry research conducted in Mongolia found that long-eared jerboas used minimum areas ranging from approximately 2 to 14.5 hectares during short-term observations in July. Researchers also recorded distances of up to 833 meters between burrows used by an individual (Stubbe et al., 2007). A separate study estimated average home ranges of 12.7 ± 3.2 hectares using the minimum convex polygon method and 14.4 ± 3.1 hectares using the 95% fixed-kernel method (Uuganbadrakh, 2010).

== Conservation ==
The long-eared jerboa was identified as one of the top-10 "focal species" in 2007 by the Evolutionarily Distinct and Globally Endangered (EDGE) project.

In 2007 Zoological Society of London EDGE of Existence Programme sent a researcher to study human impact on its environment. The study returned with video footage that has been noted as the "first time" the creature has been "recorded on camera". This has helped to start a campaign to protect them.
