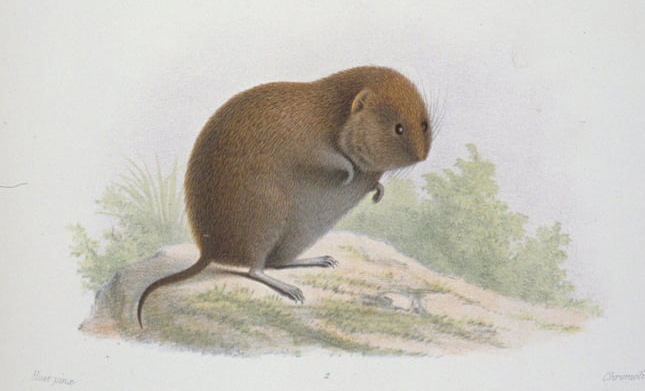
- Eothenomys melanogaster

Scientific classification
- Domain: Eukaryota
- Kingdom: Animalia
- Phylum: Chordata
- Class: Mammalia
- Order: Rodentia
- Family: Cricetidae
- Subfamily: Arvicolinae
- Tribe: Clethrionomyini
- Genus: Eothenomys; Miller, 1896

Type species
- Arvicola melanogaster A. Milne-Edwards, 1871

Species
- Eothenomys cachinus Eothenomys chinensis Eothenomys custos Eothenomys melanogaster Eothenomys miletus Eothenomys olitor Eothenomys proditor Eothenomys wardi

= Eothenomys =

Genus of rodents

Eothenomys is a genus of rodent in the family Cricetidae. It contains the following species:

- Kachin red-backed vole (Eothenomys cachinus)
- Pratt's vole (Eothenomys chinensis)
- Southwest China vole (Eothenomys custos)
- Père David's vole (Eothenomys melanogaster)
- Yunnan red-backed vole (Eothenomys miletus)
- Chaotung vole (Eothenomys olitor)
- Yulungshan vole (Eothenomys proditor)
- Ward's red-backed vole (Eothenomys wardi)

The taxonomy of this genus is unresolved. E. chinensis, E. custos, E. olitor, E. proditor, and E. wardi are sometimes placed in the subgenus Anteliomys. The American Society of Mammalogists and other authors, in turn, recognizes Anteliomys as a distinct genus. Some authorities also recognizes Anteliomys hintoni and Anteliomys tarquinius, which are split from E. custos and E. chinensis, respectively.

Some authors also recognize E. colurnus in eastern China and Taiwan and E. eleusis in southern China and the bordering regions of Myanmar, Vietnam, Thailand, and India. The American Society of Mammalogists includes E. cachinus and E. miletus as subspecies of E. eleusis.
