= Yunnan red-backed vole =

Conservation status
- Least Concern (IUCN 3.1)

Scientific classification
- Domain: Eukaryota
- Kingdom: Animalia
- Phylum: Chordata
- Class: Mammalia
- Order: Rodentia
- Family: Cricetidae
- Subfamily: Arvicolinae
- Genus: Eothenomys
- Species: E. miletus

Binomial name
- Eothenomys miletus (Thomas, 1914)

Species of rodent

The Yunnan red-backed vole (Eothenomys miletus) is a species of rodent in the family Cricetidae. It is found in Southwest China, specifically Yunnan Province. It is the largest member of the genus Eothenomys, with a higher cranium, a soft, thick and long coat with tawny brown to reddish brown coloring and grey underparts.

It inhabits montane forests.
