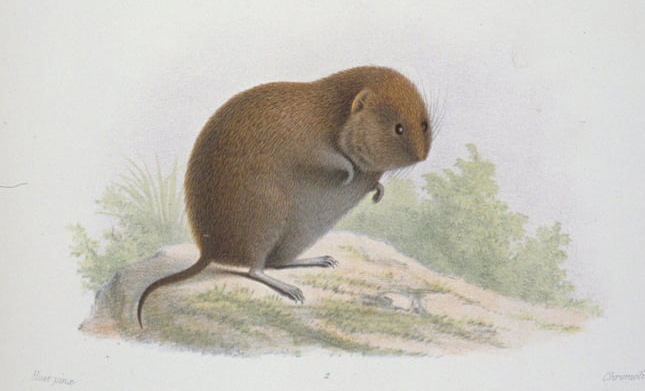

Conservation status
- Least Concern (IUCN 3.1)

Scientific classification
- Kingdom: Animalia
- Phylum: Chordata
- Class: Mammalia
- Order: Rodentia
- Family: Cricetidae
- Subfamily: Arvicolinae
- Genus: Eothenomys
- Species: E. melanogaster

Binomial name
- Eothenomys melanogaster (A. Milne-Edwards, 1871)
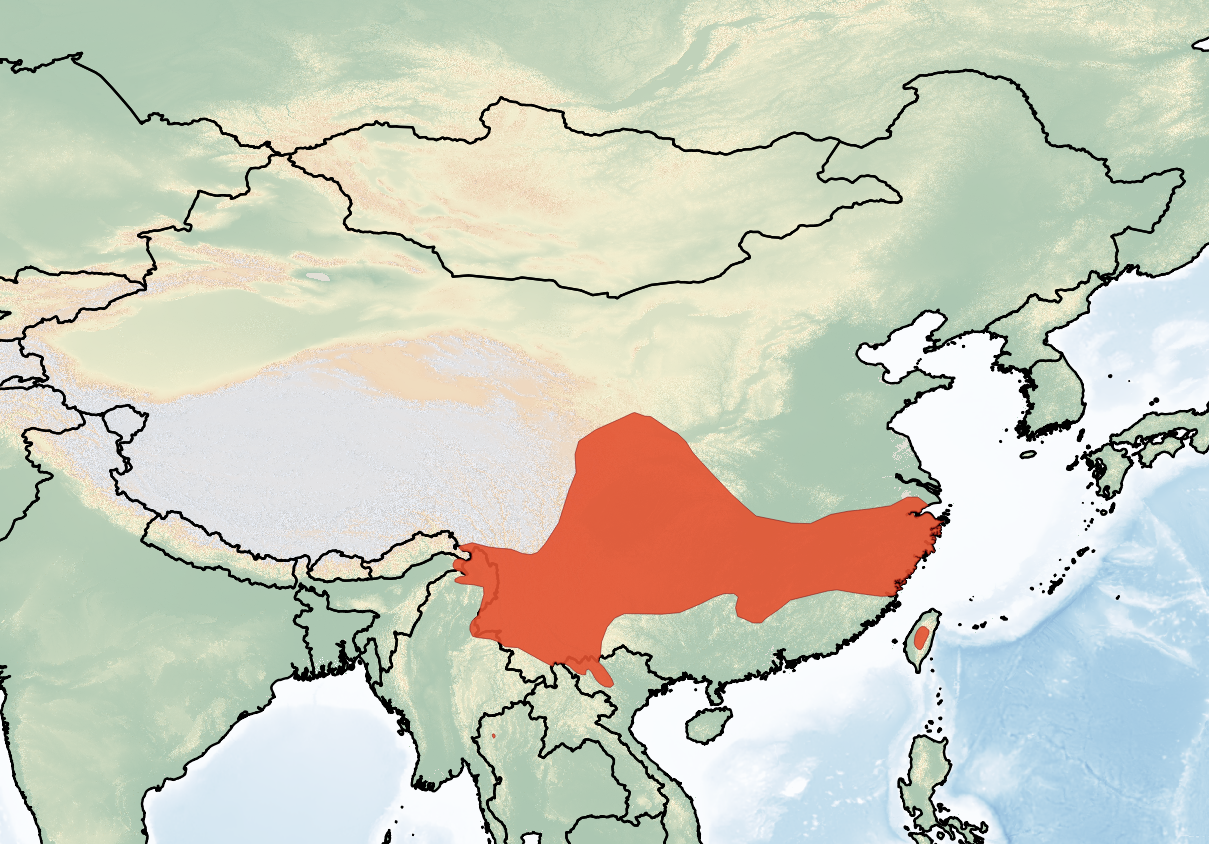

= Père David's vole =

Species of rodent

Père David's vole (Eothenomys melanogaster) is a species of rodent in the family Cricetidae. It is found in China, Myanmar, Taiwan, India, Vietnam, and Thailand. This species is a member of the melanogaster group, one of the two main groups of Eothenomys voles. Its dorsal pelage is dark brown, often nearly black, and the ventral pelage is gray, sometimes brown. The tail is shorter than the body. This species is found in pine/rhododendron forests.

Recent studies have split this species into three: E. melanogaster, E. colurnus, and E. eleusis. If recognized as distinct, E. colurnus would found in eastern China and Taiwan, E. eleusis would be in southern China and the bordering Myanmar, Thailand, Vietnam, and India, and E. melanogaster sensu stricto would be restricted to mountains of the Sichuan Basin north of the Yangtze River in central China.
