= Pratt's vole =

Conservation status
- Least Concern (IUCN 3.1)

Scientific classification
- Kingdom: Animalia
- Phylum: Chordata
- Class: Mammalia
- Order: Rodentia
- Family: Cricetidae
- Subfamily: Arvicolinae
- Genus: Eothenomys
- Species: E. chinensis

Binomial name
- Eothenomys chinensis (Thomas, 1891)

Species of rodent

Pratt's vole (Eothenomys chinensis), also called the Sichuan red-backed vole, is a species of rodent in the family Cricetidae. It is endemic to Mount Emei, Sichuan, China. It was named in 1891 for Antwerp Edgar Pratt.
