= Spermophilus citelloides =

Spermophilus citelloides Temporal range: middle Pleistocene-early Holocene

Scientific classification
- Kingdom: Animalia
- Phylum: Chordata
- Class: Mammalia
- Order: Rodentia
- Family: Sciuridae
- Genus: Spermophilus
- Species: †S. citelloides

Binomial name
- †Spermophilus citelloides Kormos, 1916

Synonyms
- Citellus citelloides

Extinct species of ground squirrel

Spermophilus citelloides is an extinct species of ground squirrel in the souslik genus Spermophilus. It was distributed in Central and Eastern Europe, appearing in the middle Pleistocene (Holsteinian) and persisting to the late Pleistocene or early Holocene. Its distribution was apparently concentrated on the Pannonian Basin and the Hungarian Steppe, but at times also encompassed a larger territory in Central-Eastern Europe. It was probably very similar to its modern relatives, including the European souslik (S. citellus) in appearance, behaviour and ecology, and therefore reliant on short-grass steppe ecosystems. A 2019 study recovered it as most closely related to the speckled ground squirrel (S. suslicus).

== Taxonomy and evolution ==
Spermophilus citelloides was preliminarily described by the Hungarian palaeontologist Tivadar Kormos in 1916. At the time, Kormos had only limited material at hand, but tentatively identified the species as a potential ancestor of the recent European ground squirrel (S. citellus), and hence he chose the name citelloides (meaning citellus-like). He did, however, note a similarity with the speckled ground squirrel as well. In the aftermath, S. citelloides received little scientific attention, and authors variably followed Kormos' reasoning, emphasised a closer relationship to the speckled ground squirrel, or saw in S. citelloides a common ancestor of both. It was not until 2019 that, this time with more diagnostic material, a team of researchers scrutinised S. citelloides again. They re-described the species and established a close relationship with the speckled ground squirrel. (The Podolian ground squirrel (S. odessanus) was only more recently recognised as different from the speckled ground squirrel, and is considered as conspecific to it in these accounts). This study also confirmed that the species is not an ancestor to either the European or the speckled ground squirrel, but most likely shares a direct common ancestor with the latter. This ancestor may be the earlier European species S. primigenius, which preceded it in Central Europe, or possibly a transitional form that awaits description still, and is currently treated as S. aff. primigenius.

== Description ==
The Pannonian souslik was a medium-sized species of souslik, with an estimated size similar to that of the European souslik. Its skull is estimated to be 42–44 millimetres (1.7–1.7 in) in length, larger than in the European and the speckled souslik, but smaller than large, Asiatic species such as the russet (S. major), yellow (S. fulvus) and relict ground squirrel (S. relictus). It is similar in morphology to the European souslik and, in particular, to the speckled souslik, but exhibits features that characterise it as a distinct species.

== Distribution and habitat ==
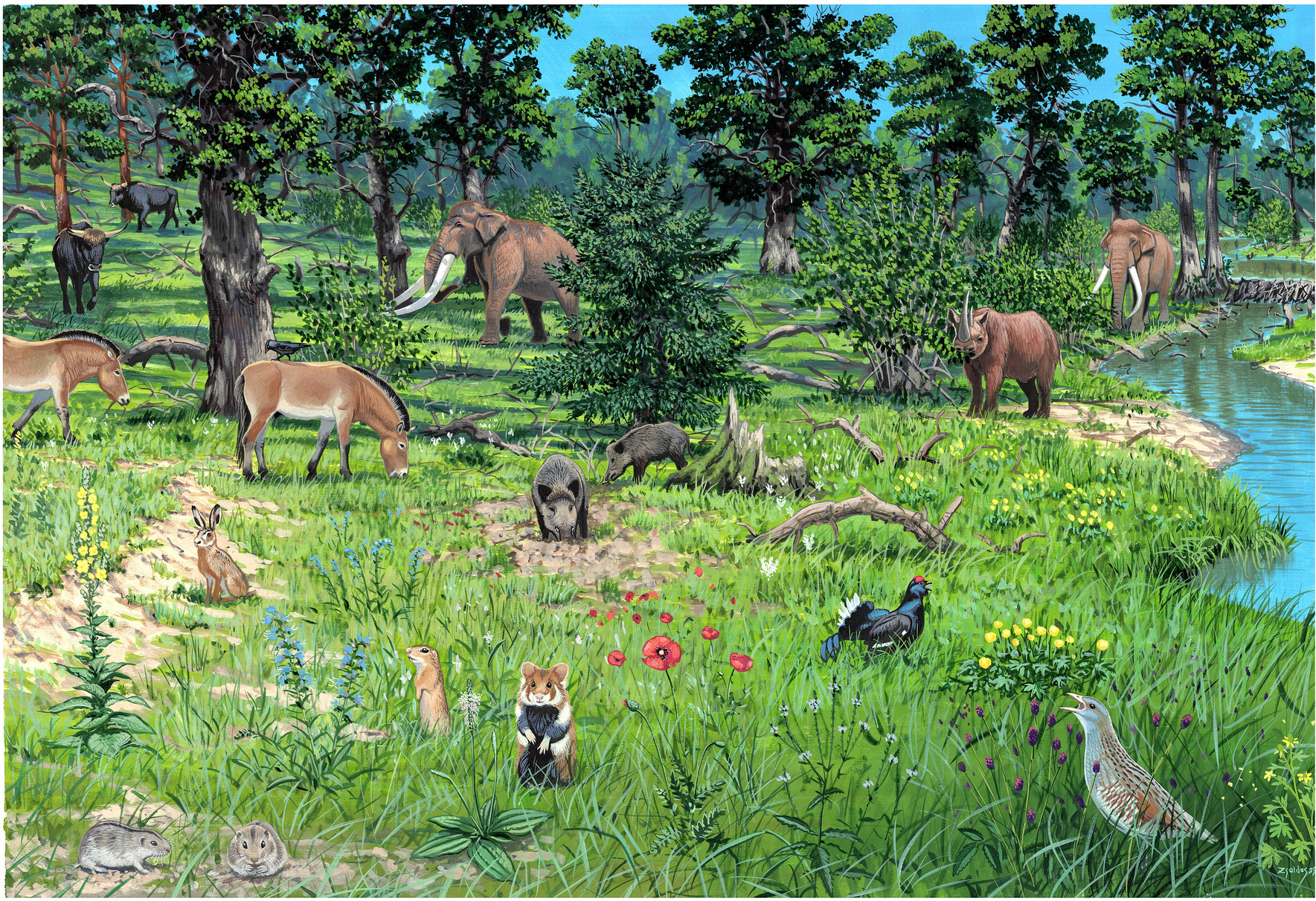
Landscape of Central Europe during the Last Interglacial (130-115,000 years ago) featuring Spermophilus citelloides (foreground centre left) as well as other animals like the straight-tusked elephant, Merck's rhinoceros, wild boar, wild horse, aurochs, western jackdaw, corn crake, black grouse, steppe lemming, European hare and European hamster

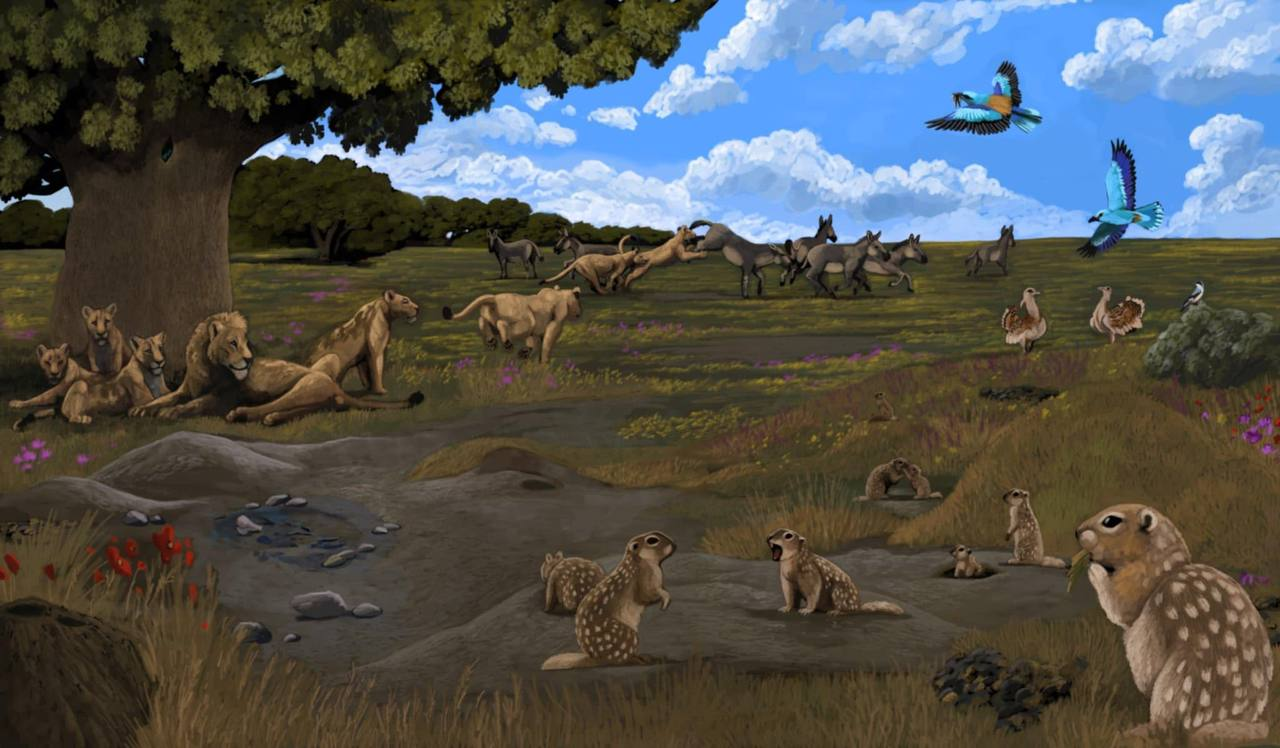
An artist's interpretation of a Pannonian souslik colony (lower right corner) in the early-middle Holocene of the Pannonian Basin. Other animals shown are Asiatic lions (Panthera leo leo), European wild ass (Equus hemionus hydruntinus), great bustards (Otis tarda), European rollers (Coracias garulus) and a lesser grey shrike (Lanius minor).

The species is known from a number of localities. Most of these are located in the Pannonian Basin, with others scattered further into Germany, Poland and Dobruja, suggesting that the species was relatively widespread, but generally only west of the Carpathian Mountains. Ground squirrels today exhibit strict allopatry, meaning that their ranges generally do not overlap extensively, and this seems to have also been the case in the Pleistocene. To the south, the species' range bordered roughly on the Danube, as well as the European ground squirrel's range, which at the time was only distributed in the southern Balkans. However, it appears that the Danube was not entirely insurmountable for sousliks, as both the Pannonian and the European souslik are known to have crossed it at times (probably mostly as a result of gradual changes in course, such as river channel oscillations, rather than by swimming). Thus, climatic and ecological parameters, and in particular interspecific competition, where probably senior in importance to the Danube in maintaining the geographical separation between both species. In the east, S. citelloides' range was apparently limited by the Carpathian Mountains, and by the Podolian ground squirrel.

At a number of sites S. citelloides coexisted, however, with the larger, also extinct S. superciliosus, which is considered to be closely related to the yellow ground squirrel of Central Asia. This coexistence was apparently made possible by the considerable size difference between the two species, as per Hutchinson's rule. This is also the case today between the little ground squirrel (S. pygmaeus) and the yellow ground squirrel, for example, across much of western Central Asia. In contrast, the apparent coexistence between the Pannonian and the European souslik at some sites in the Pannonian Plain, or the isolated occurrence of only the latter before the Holocene in the region, can probably be attributed to erroneous identification.

Like its modern relatives, S. citelloides probably inhabited open grassland and steppe habitats. Moreover, modern Spermophilus species are strongly reliant on short-grass habitats and low vegetation cover, and are therefore frequently associated with large grazers such as cattle, horses and saiga antelope. When grazing animals are absent and the vegetation grows taller, sousliks are more exposed to predation by their many predators – such as the steppe polecat, marbled polecat, steppe eagle and imperial eagle – as their vision and their alarm call system is impeded. This may lead to population declines and extinctions. On the other hand, sousliks may tolerate high levels of grazing pressure, and outcompete smaller steppe rodents, such as voles, pikas, hamsters and jerboas, under these conditions.

== Extinction ==
The Pannonian souslik disappears from the fossil record at the Pleistocene-Holocene boundary, after the end of the Last Ice Age. Its precise extinction date is unknown, however, with the youngest remains estimated as around 12,000 years old. Its extinction precedes that of other steppe rodents from the Pannonian Basin: Lasiopodomys anglicus, European close relative of the narrow-headed vole (Lasiopodomys gregalis), the steppe pika (Ochotona pusilla) and the bobak marmot (Marmota bobak). The later spread of the European souslik into the Pannonian Basin and Central Europe is associated with the movements of Neolithic farming communities and their livestock along the Danube, which triggered vegetational changes that would have benefitted sousliks once more. Still, the European souslik was most likely only able to expand its range further north only due to the Pannonian souslik's earlier extinction.
