= List of mammals of Moldova =

This list shows the IUCN Red List status of the 32 mammal species occurring in Moldova. One is endangered, four are vulnerable, and three are near threatened.

Icons which state each species' global IUCN status:
EN	Endangered	Facing an extremely high risk of extinction in the wild
VU	Vulnerable	Facing a high risk of extinction in the wild
NT	Near Threatened	Doesn't meet any criteria that would categorise it as risking extinction but likely to in the future
LC	Least Concern	No current identifiable risks to this species

== Order: Rodentia (rodents) ==
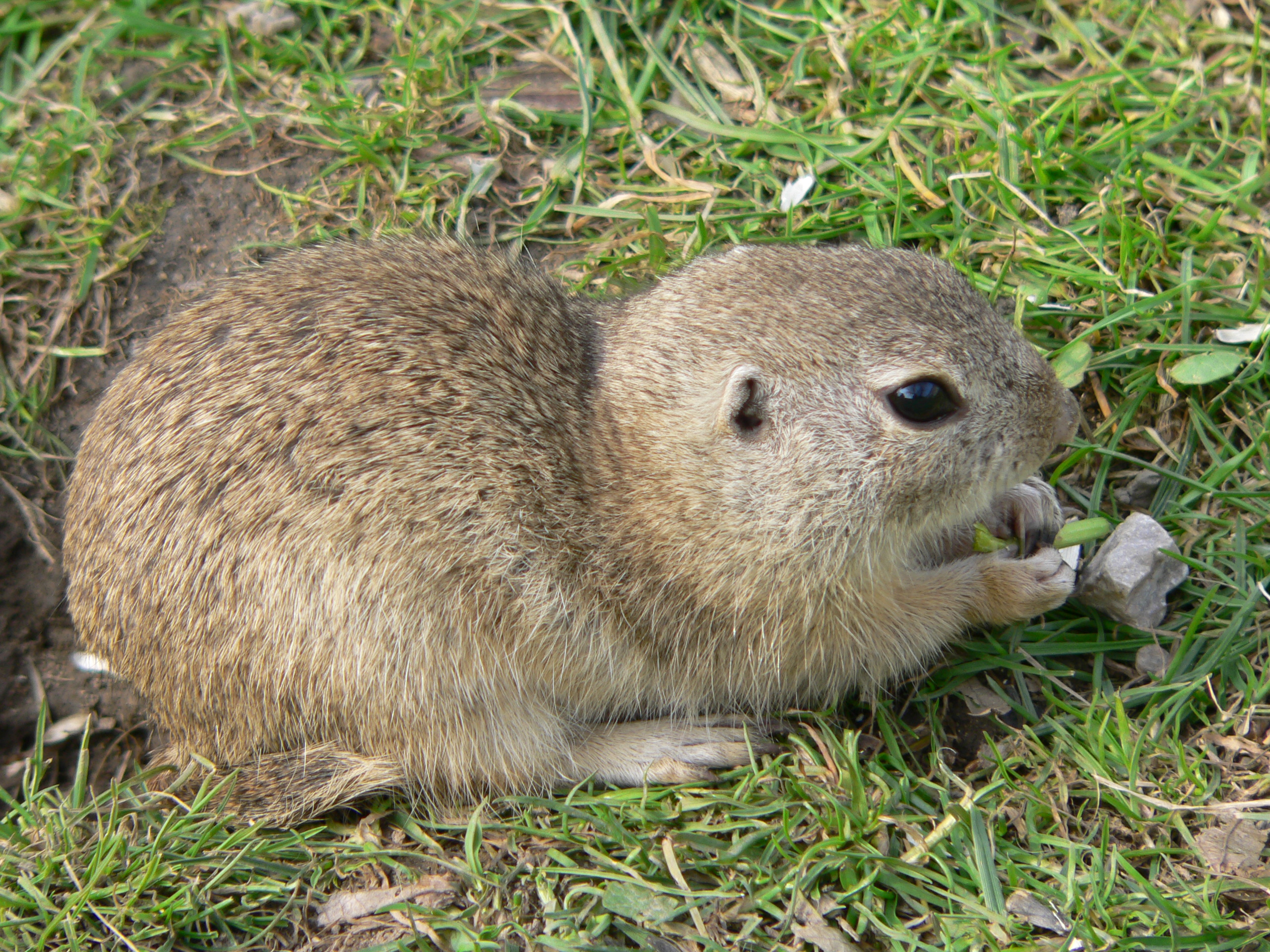
European ground squirrel

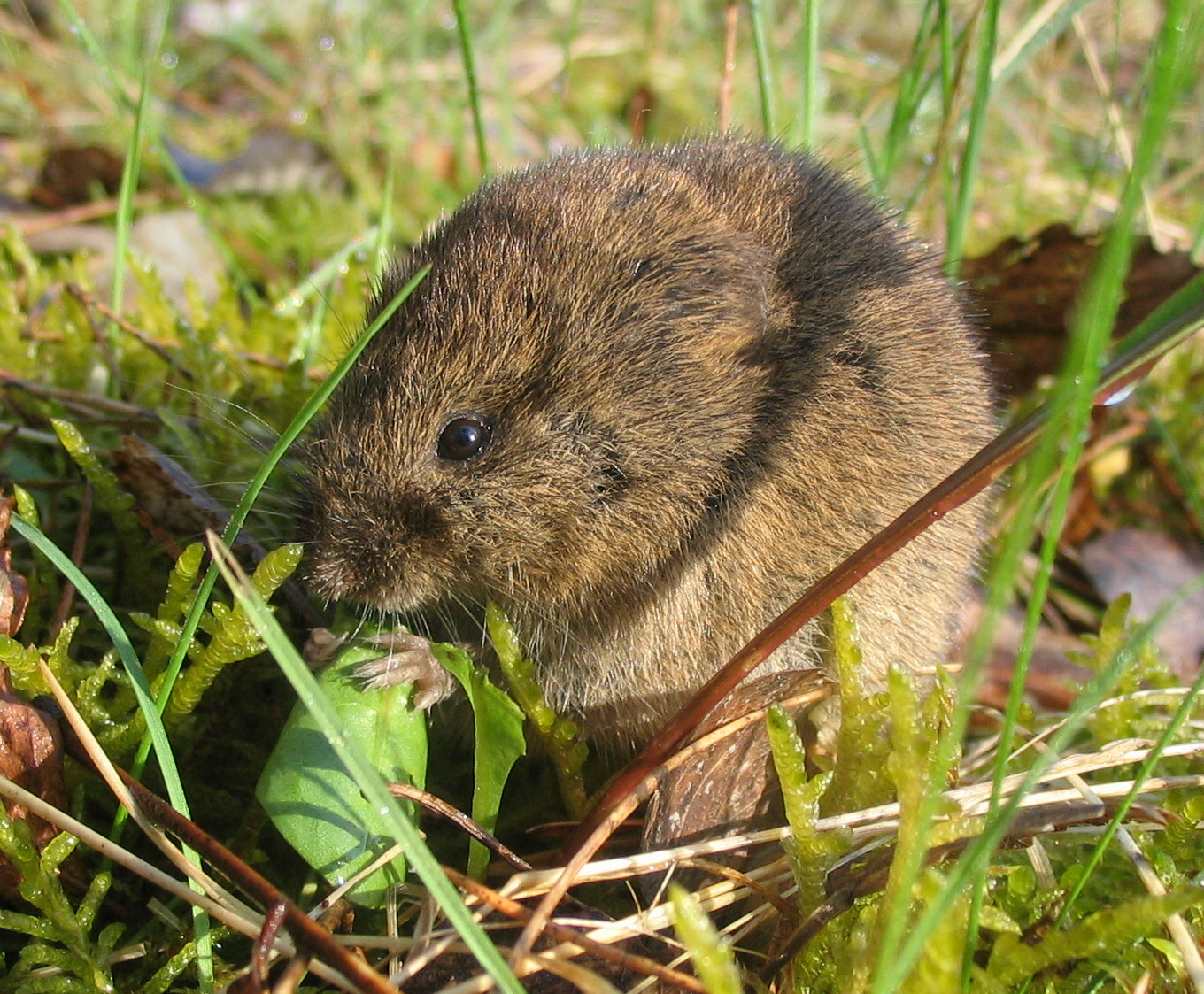
Common vole

Rodents make up the largest order of mammals, with over 40% of mammalian species. They have two incisors in the upper and lower jaw which grow continually and must be kept short by gnawing. Most rodents are small though the capybara can weigh up to 45 kg (99 lb).

- Suborder: Sciurognathi
  - Family: Castoridae (beavers)
    - Genus: Castor
      - Eurasian beaver, C. fiber LC
  - Family: Sciuridae (squirrels)
    - Subfamily: Xerinae
      - Tribe: Marmotini
        - Genus: Spermophilus
          - European ground squirrel, Spermophilus citellus EN
  - Family: Gliridae (dormice)
    - Subfamily: Leithiinae
      - Genus: Dryomys
        - Forest dormouse, Dryomys nitedula LC
  - Family: Cricetidae
    - Subfamily: Cricetinae
      - Genus: Cricetulus
        - Grey dwarf hamster, Cricetulus migratorius LC
    - Subfamily: Arvicolinae
      - Genus: Clethrionomys
        - Bank vole, Clethrionomys glareolus LC
      - Genus: Microtus
        - Common vole, Microtus arvalis LC
        - European pine vole, Microtus subterraneus LC

== Order: Lagomorpha (lagomorphs) ==
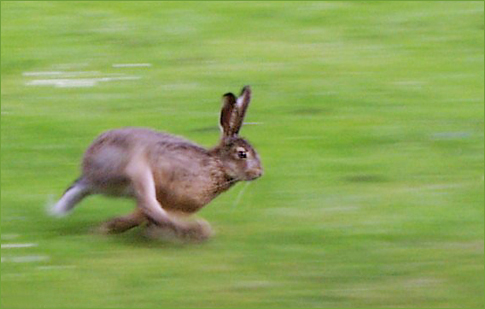
European hare

The lagomorphs comprise two families, Leporidae (hares and rabbits), and Ochotonidae (pikas). Though they can resemble rodents, and were classified as a superfamily in that order until the early twentieth century, they have since been considered a separate order. They differ from rodents in a number of physical characteristics, such as having four incisors in the upper jaw rather than two.

- Family: Leporidae (rabbits, hares)
  - Genus: Lepus
    - European hare, L. europaeus LC

== Order: Eulipotyphla (hedgehogs, shrews and moles) ==
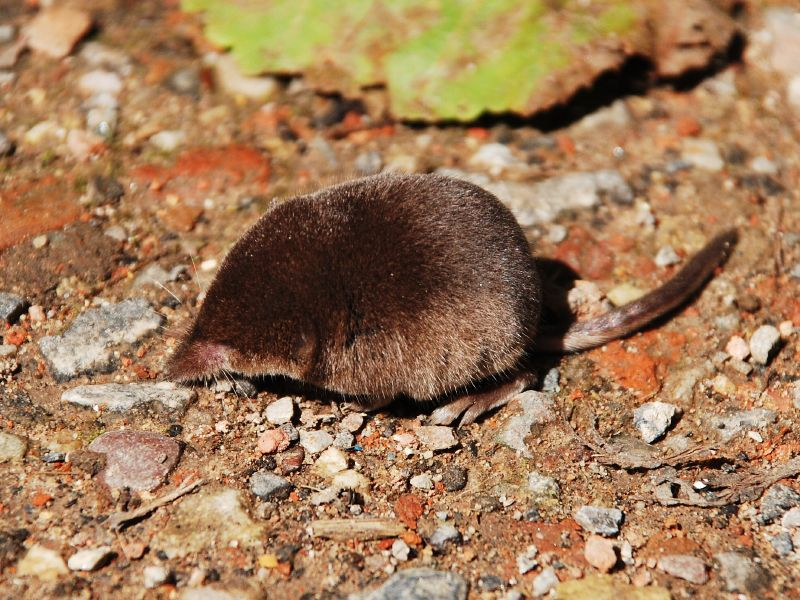
Eurasian pygmy shrew

Hedgehogs are easily recognised by their spines, shrews closely resemble mice, and moles are stout-bodied burrowers.

- Family: Erinaceidae (hedgehogs)
  - Subfamily: Erinaceinae
    - Genus: Erinaceus
      - Northern white-breasted hedgehog, E. roumanicus LC
- Family: Soricidae (shrews)
  - Subfamily: Crocidurinae
    - Genus: Crocidura
      - Bicolored shrew, C. leucodon LC
      - Lesser white-toothed shrew, C. suaveolens LC
  - Subfamily: Soricinae
    - Tribe: Soricini
      - Genus: Sorex
        - Eurasian pygmy shrew, S. minutus LC

== Order: Chiroptera (bats) ==
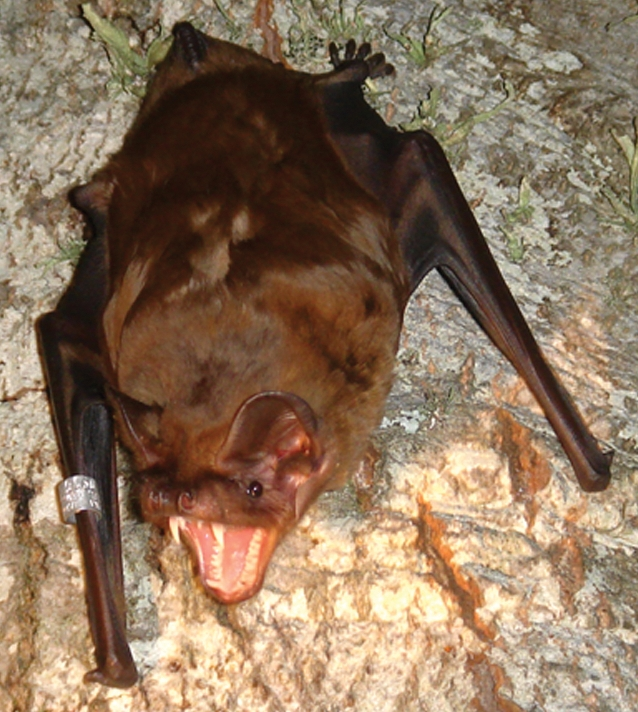
Greater noctule bat

The bats' most distinguishing feature is that their forelimbs are developed as wings, making them the only mammals capable of flight. Bat species account for about 20% of all mammals.

- Family: Vespertilionidae
  - Subfamily: Myotinae
    - Genus: Myotis
      - Bechstein's bat, M. bechsteini NT
      - Pond bat, M. dasycneme NT
  - Subfamily: Vespertilioninae
    - Genus: Barbastella
      - Western barbastelle, B. barbastellus NT
    - Genus: Nyctalus
      - Greater noctule bat, N. lasiopterus VU
      - Lesser noctule, N. leisleri LC
    - Genus: Pipistrellus
      - Common pipistrelle, P. pipistrellus LC
- Family: Rhinolophidae
  - Subfamily: Rhinolophinae
    - Genus: Rhinolophus
      - Greater horseshoe bat, R. ferrumequinum LC
      - Lesser horseshoe bat, R. hipposideros LC

== Order: Carnivora (carnivorans) ==
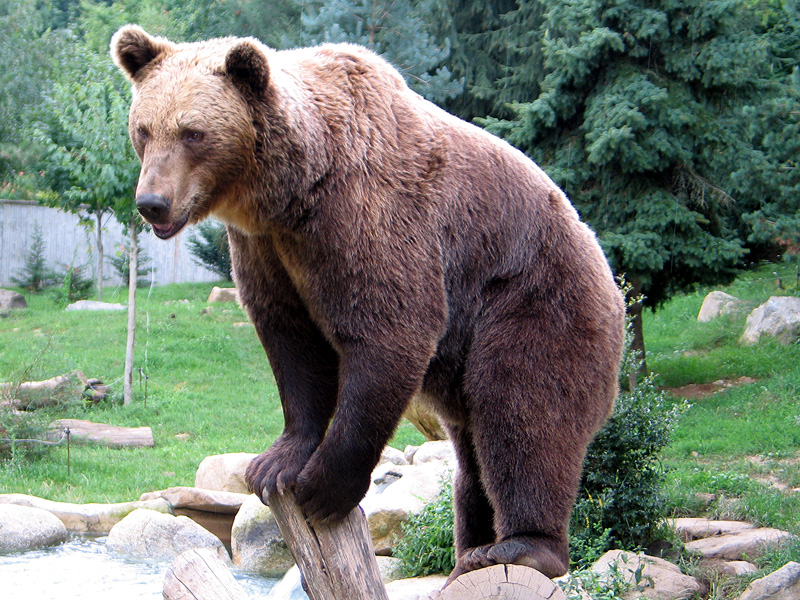
Brown bear

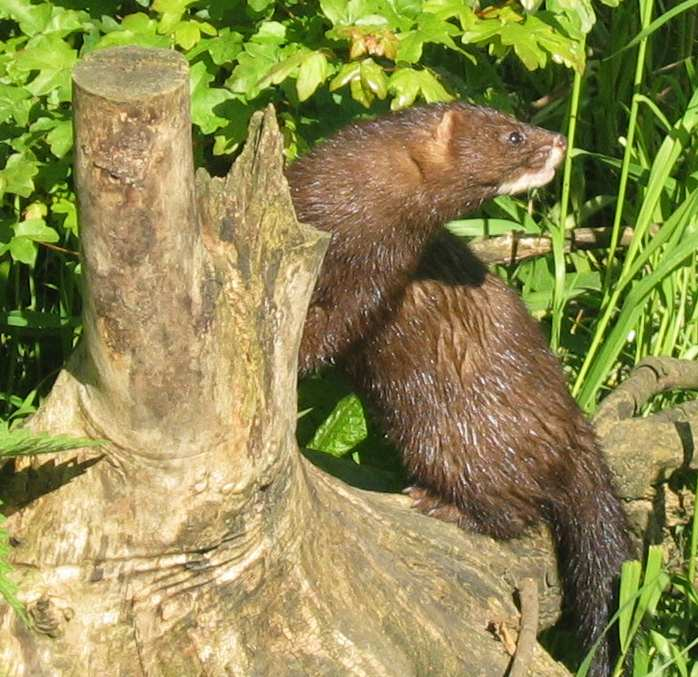
European mink

There are over 260 species of carnivorans, the majority of which feed primarily on meat. They have a characteristic skull shape and dentition.

- Suborder: Feliformia
  - Family: Felidae (cats)
    - Subfamily: Felinae
      - Genus: Felis
        - European wildcat, F. silvestris LC
      - Genus: Lynx
        - Eurasian lynx, L. lynx LC
- Suborder: Caniformia
  - Family: Canidae (dogs, foxes)
    - Genus: Canis
      - Gray wolf, C. lupus LC
        - Eurasian wolf, C. l. lupus
    - Genus: Vulpes
      - Red fox, V. vulpes LC
  - Family: Mustelidae (mustelids)
    - Genus: Lutra
      - European otter, L. lutra NT
    - Genus: Martes
      - Beech marten, M. foina LC
    - Genus: Meles
      - European badger, M. meles LC
    - Genus: Mustela
      - Stoat, M. erminea LC
      - Steppe polecat, M. eversmannii LC
      - Least weasel, M. nivalis LC
      - European polecat, M. putorius LC

== Order: Artiodactyla (even-toed ungulates) ==
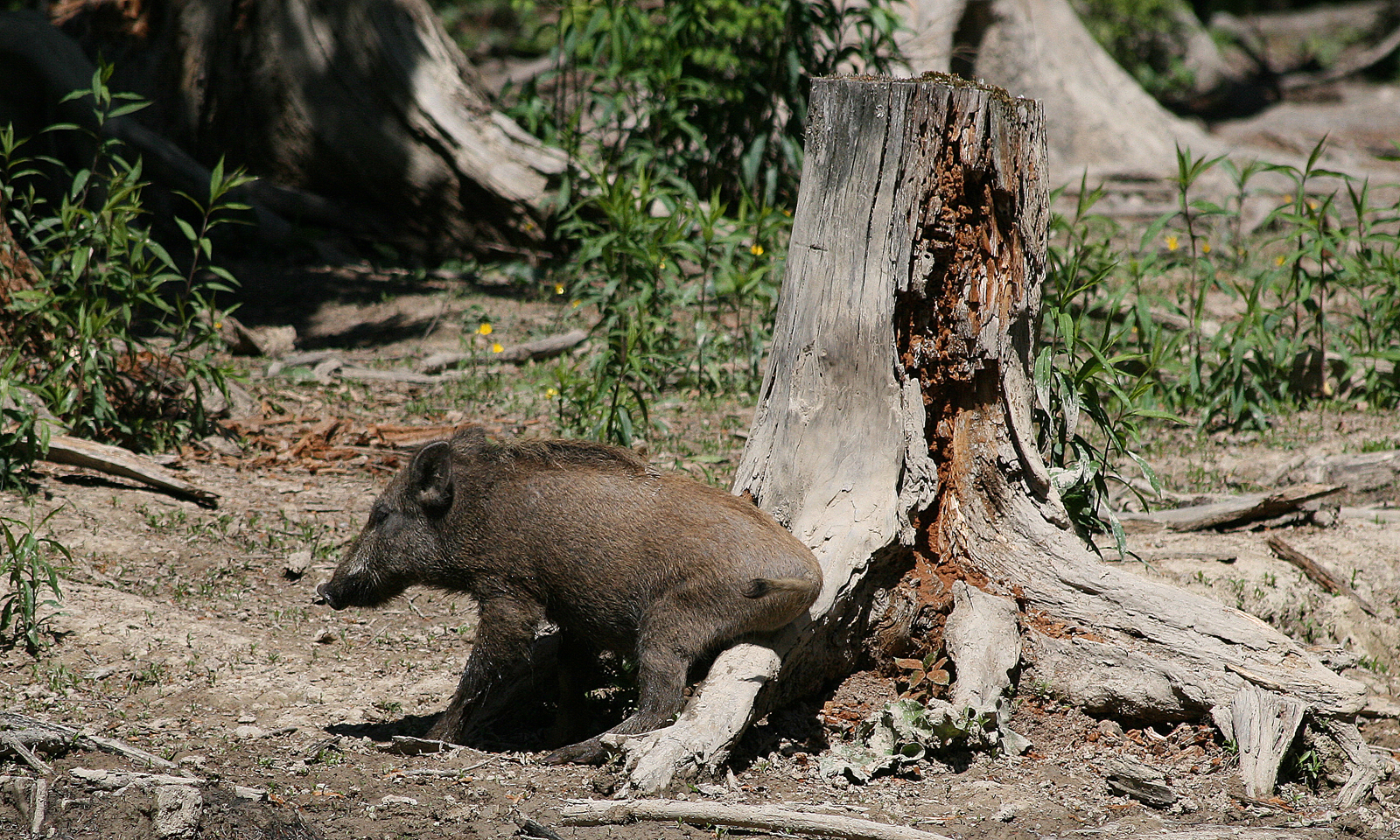
Wild boar

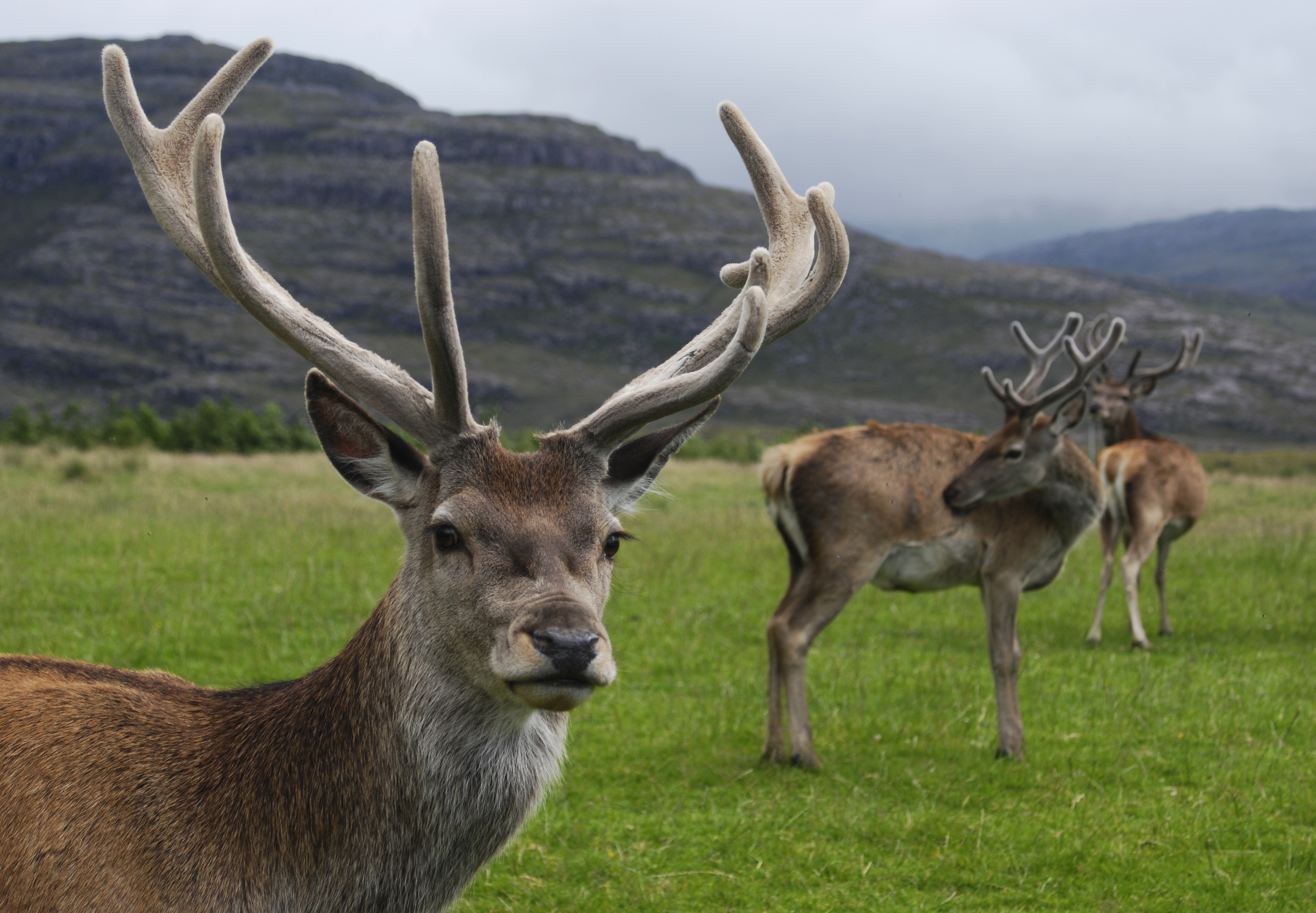
Red deer

The even-toed ungulates are ungulates whose weight is borne about equally by the third and fourth toes, rather than mostly or entirely by the third as in perissodactyls. There are about 220 artiodactyl species, including many that are of great economic importance to humans.

- Family: Cervidae (deer)
  - Subfamily: Capreolinae
    - Genus: Alces
      - Moose, A. alces LC
    - Genus: Capreolus
      - Roe deer, C. capreolus LC
  - Subfamily: Cervinae
    - Genus: Cervus
      - Red deer, C. elaphus LC
    - Genus: Dama
      - European fallow deer, D. dama LC introduced
- Family: Suidae (pigs)
  - Subfamily: Suinae
    - Genus: Sus
      - Wild boar, S. scrofa LC

== Locally extinct ==
The following species are locally extinct in the country:

- European bison, Bison bonasus
- European mink, Mustela lutreola
- Brown bear, Ursus arctos
- Saiga antelope, Saiga tartarica
- Wild horse, Equus ferus

== See also ==
- List of chordate orders
- Lists of mammals by region
- List of prehistoric mammals
- Mammal classification
- List of mammals described in the 2000s
