= Pallid ground squirrel =

Conservation status
- Least Concern (IUCN 3.1)

Scientific classification
- Kingdom: Animalia
- Phylum: Chordata
- Class: Mammalia
- Order: Rodentia
- Family: Sciuridae
- Genus: Spermophilus
- Species: S. pallidicauda

Binomial name
- Spermophilus pallidicauda (Satunin, 1903)

Species of rodent

The pallid ground squirrel (Spermophilus pallidicauda) is a species of rodent in the family Sciuridae. It is found in Mongolia and the adjacent Nei Mongol autonomous region.

A generic revision of the genus was undertaken in 2007 which helped resolve the uncertainty as to whether this species should be considered a subspecies of Spermophilus erythrogenys. A phylogeny based on molecular sequence data determined that S. pallidicauda was indeed a separate species from S. erythrogenys, and from the other similar species in the genus, S. brevicauda and S. alashanicus.

== Distribution ==
The pallid ground squirrel is found in Mongolia near Lake Khulu-Nur and the Baidarak River and in Ullyn Bulyk, the Mongolian and the Gobi Altai Mountains. The closely related species, Spermophilus alashanicus from the Alashan Desert and Spermophilus brevicauda, found in eastern Kazakhstan and in Tian Shan mountain range, are allopatric in distribution as they are largely separated by geographic boundaries. It has been found to hybridise with P. alashanicus where their ranges do overlap.

== Description ==
This ground squirrel has a strawy-brown colour which takes on a more sandy hue in summer but is still paler than other similar species. The short tail is a whitish-yellow colour with a rust coloured stripe most of the way along the upper side. There is a white streak across the side of the face, white eyelids and a rusty coloured spot under each eye. The underside is generally paler and the length is about twenty centimetres.

== Biology ==
This species is quite common in the grasslands of the Gobi and nearby areas. It is a colonial species and active during the day.
