= Osmanius balthasari =

Scientific classification
- Kingdom: Animalia
- Phylum: Arthropoda
- Clade: Pancrustacea
- Class: Insecta
- Order: Coleoptera
- Suborder: Polyphaga
- Infraorder: Scarabaeiformia
- Family: Scarabaeidae
- Genus: Osmanius
- Species: O. balthasari

Binomial name
- Osmanius balthasari (Petrovitz, 1963)

Synonyms
- Paracoptochirus balthasari Petrovitz, 1963

Species of beetle

Osmanius balthasari is a species of beetle of the family Scarabaeidae. It is found in Greece, Iran and Turkey.

== Description ==
Adults reach a length of about 4–5.5 mm (0.16–0.22 in). They have an elongate, subparallel, moderately convex, shortly pubescent body. The head and pronotum are shiny, while the elytra are mostly dull. They are dark brown, with paler legs.

== Life history ==
Specimens have been collected in the burrows of Spermophilus citellus.
