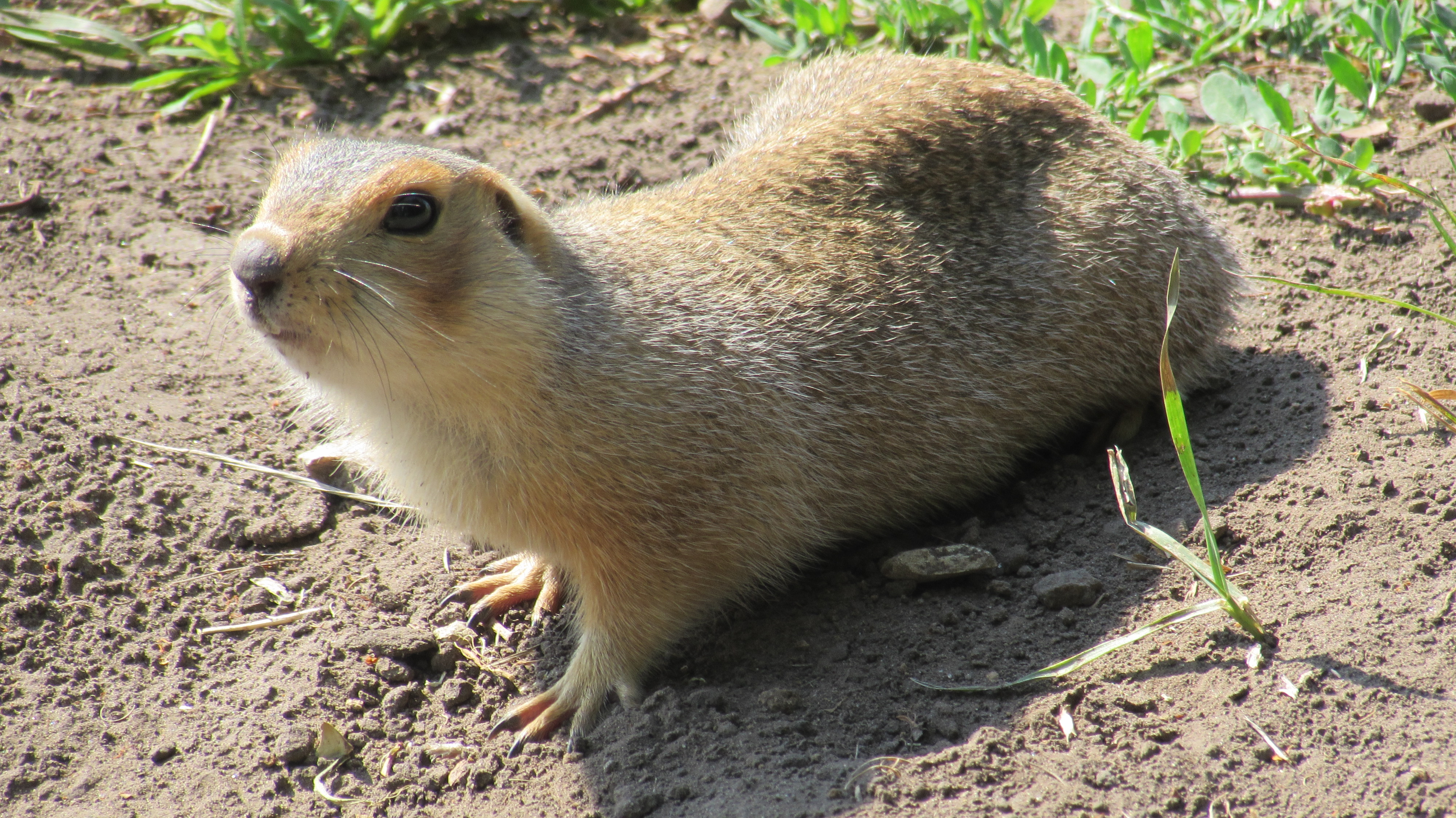

Conservation status
- Least Concern (IUCN 3.1)

Scientific classification
- Kingdom: Animalia
- Phylum: Chordata
- Class: Mammalia
- Order: Rodentia
- Family: Sciuridae
- Genus: Spermophilus
- Species: S. major

Binomial name
- Spermophilus major (Pallas, 1778)

Synonyms
- S. argyropuloi (Bazhanov, 1947); S. rufescens (Keyserling and Blasius, 1840); S. selevini (Argyropulo, 1941)

= Russet ground squirrel =

Species of rodent

The russet ground squirrel (Spermophilus major) is a species of rodent in the family Sciuridae. It is also known as the hibernating large ground squirrel and the large-toothed souslik. It is found in west central Asia where its natural habitat is temperate grassland.

== Distribution ==
The russet ground squirrel is found on steppe between the Volga and Irtysh rivers in Russia and North Kazakhstan, and to the west of the Volga River in the north west part of the Volga Hills. It has also been reported from Xinjiang but this was probably a misidentification of the rather similar species, Spermophilus brevicauda. Its range is expanding to the south and west of its present range. This is believed to be because roads and other developments increase the number of water channels and long grasses. It is now able to cross the Volga due to the construction of dams in four different places. These produce areas of static water which retain ice cover for longer, allowing individuals to move to new aeas. It is found at altitudes of up to 600 metres.

== Morphology ==
The russet ground squirrel has a stout, low-slung body, short legs and a well-furred tail. The back is dark ochre-brown, barred or mottled with light ochre. The top of the head and nose bridge are silvery-grayish. On the cheeks and above the eyes are rufous patches. The tail appears reddish from below and the tip is pale. The body length is up to 340 millimetres (13 in) and the tail length, up to 105 millimetres (4.1 in). The weight is about 500 grams (1.1 lb).

== Ecology ==
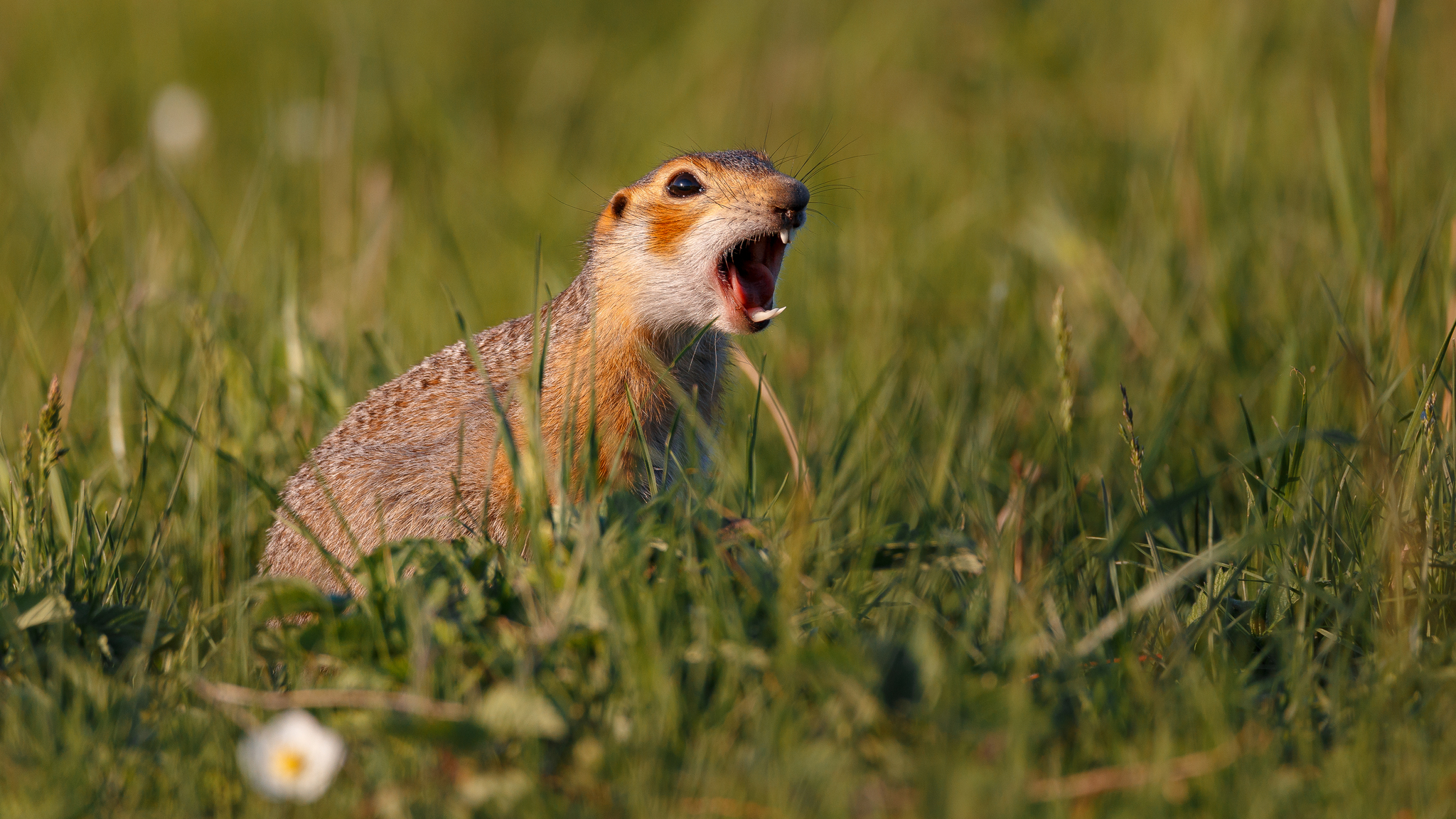
Russet ground squirrel alarm calling

The russet ground squirrel lives on plains, sub-mountain steppes and semi-deserts. It is found along river valleys, at the edges of forests, on the slopes of ravines, on road sides, pastures and uncultivated lands. It excavates permanent burrows about a metre in depth with a vertical entrance and a total passage length of about two metres. Temporary burrows are not so deep, have slanting entrance passages and are more simply constructed. This species is diurnal, older animals being most active in the mornings and evenings while the young are active most of the day. Winter hibernation lasts for about six and a half to eight and a half months. The date of emergence depends on spring conditions and may vary by up to twenty five days. The diet consists of the green parts of plants, roots, bulbs, grass seed, cereals and other agricultural crops. Reproduction takes place in the summer with pregnancy lasting approximately 23 days and the brood size averaging seven to eight young. These grow rapidly and are fully grown in two and a half months. The population is subject to periodic fluctuations with population surges being followed by population troughs. During the latter, single individuals may be found occupying burrows previously inhabited by large colonies. The main factors that determine mortality include exceptionally cold weather during the hibernation period, the late arrival of spring, human disturbance, predators and outbreaks of disease.
