= Tian Shan ground squirrel =

Conservation status
- Least Concern (IUCN 3.1)

Scientific classification
- Kingdom: Animalia
- Phylum: Chordata
- Class: Mammalia
- Order: Rodentia
- Family: Sciuridae
- Genus: Spermophilus
- Species: S. nilkaensis

Binomial name
- Spermophilus nilkaensis Lanxin & Sibo, 1989

Species of rodent

The Tian Shan ground squirrel (Spermophilus nilkaensis) is a species of squirrel found in the grasslands of western China, Kazakhstan, and Kyrgyzstan. A close relative of Spermophilus relictus, it was formerly considered the same species. It was formerly known as Spermophilus ralli, but that name is now known to be a synonym of S. relictus.

== Description ==
This ground squirrel is about twenty centimetres (8 in) long with a tail of six centimetres (2 in) and weighs 300 to 400 grams (11 to 14 oz). In the summer the coat is grayish or yellowish brown above with some indistinct lighter coloured spots, paler on the sides and yellowish-gray underneath. In the winter it is altogether paler and grayer. The tail has a distinctive dark coloured band and a yellowish white tip. There are no facial markings like those found in several closely related species.

== Distribution ==
This species is found in pastureland in western Xinjiang and Kazakhstan whereas S. relictus is found in the westernmost part of the Tian Shan mountains.

== Biology ==
This species digs a complex of tunnels with a number of entrances close to each other. It is diurnal but retreats underground during the heat of the day. It often stands erect outside its burrow on its hind legs surveying the scene and is quite vocal at times. The diet consists of grasses and other vegetation, insects and other small arthropods. It hibernates for about six months from early September and the female gives birth after emergence in the spring. The gestation period is about twenty six days with three to seven young in a litter.
