= Spermophilus brevicauda =

Conservation status
- Least Concern (IUCN 3.1)

Scientific classification
- Kingdom: Animalia
- Phylum: Chordata
- Class: Mammalia
- Order: Rodentia
- Family: Sciuridae
- Genus: Spermophilus
- Species: S. brevicauda

Binomial name
- Spermophilus brevicauda (Brandt, 1843)

Synonyms
- S. carruthersi (Thomas, 1912); S. intermedius (Brandt, 1844); S. ilensis (Belyaev, 1945); S. saryarka (Selevin, 1937); S. selevini (Argyropolu, 1941)

Species of rodent

Spermophilus brevicauda (Brandt's ground squirrel) is a species of rodent in the family Sciuridae. It is found in eastern Kazakhstan and the northern half of the Xinjiang region of China.

A generic revision of the genus was undertaken in 2007 which helped resolve the uncertainty as to whether this species should be considered a subspecies of Spermophilus erythrogenys. A phylogeny based on molecular sequence data determined that S. brevicauda was indeed a separate species from S. erythrogenys, and from the other similar species in the genus, S. pallidicauda and S. alashanicus.

== Description ==
Brandt's ground squirrel is smaller than most other Spermophilus species being 165 to 210 millimetres long with a short tail some 30 to 50 millimetres long and weighing up to 440 grams. It is an ochre brown colour with distinctive lighter coloured spots. The hind feet are russet as is the tail, though in some parts of the range the tail is yellowish. There are paler regions around the eyes with rust coloured patches above and below.

== Distribution ==
Brandt's ground squirrel is found from the Lake Zaysan region in eastern Kazakhstan, southwards and westwards along the Tian Shan mountain range to the vicinity of Almaty, on both sides of the Kazakh-Chinese border. The closely related species, Spermophilus alashanicus from the Alashan Desert and Spermophilus pallidicauda, found in north east Gansu and Inner Mongolia, are allopatric in distribution, separated as they are by geographic boundaries.

== Biology ==
This species is found in dry steppes and semi-desert brushlands. It lives either communally or singly in burrows where it hibernates in winter and aestivates in excessive summer heat. The entrance to the burrow is often found at the base of a bush. The diet is primarily vegetarian consisting of seasonal plant growth including young shoots of certain shrubs, bulbs and tubers. Unlike some other related species, Brandt's ground squirrel seldom stands erect on its two hind legs and its alarm cry is a quiet squeak.
