= Daurian ground squirrel =

Conservation status
- Least Concern (IUCN 3.1)

Scientific classification
- Kingdom: Animalia
- Phylum: Chordata
- Class: Mammalia
- Order: Rodentia
- Family: Sciuridae
- Genus: Spermophilus
- Species: S. dauricus

Binomial name
- Spermophilus dauricus Brandt, 1843

Species of rodent

The Daurian ground squirrel (Spermophilus dauricus) is a species of rodent in the family Sciuridae. It is found in China, Mongolia, and Russia.

== Distribution ==
The daurian ground squirrel has a wide range in north east China, extending into Mongolia and Transbaikalia region of Russia. There are two subspecies in China, S. d. mongolicus is found in Hebei, Beijing, Tianjin, Henan and Shandong, and S. d. ramosus, found in Jilin, Heilongjiang, Liaoning, eastern Inner Mongolia and Shanxi.

== Description ==
This small ground squirrel measures between 165 and 270 millimetres long with a short tail about one fifth of its body length. Its weight varies between 165 and 265 grams. The body colour is a buff or grayish-russet with no spotting. The tail is tipped with yellow and has a distinctive dark band immediately anterior to this. There is a pale ring round the eye which extends to the ear. The soles of the fore feet are bare while those of the hind feet are covered with hairs. The coat is short and coarse in summer but longer and softer in the winter.

== Biology ==
This ground squirrel lives in open plains and on the fringes of desert areas such as the northern edge of the Gobi Desert in Mongolia. It is a colonial species, digging relatively simple burrows which usually have just two entrance holes. The tunnels seldom exceed two metres in length though they occasionally extend much further. The young are born in the spring in a grass-lined nest at a depth of half a metre. Litter size varies between two and nine. The diet consists of the green parts of plants, seeds and grain.
