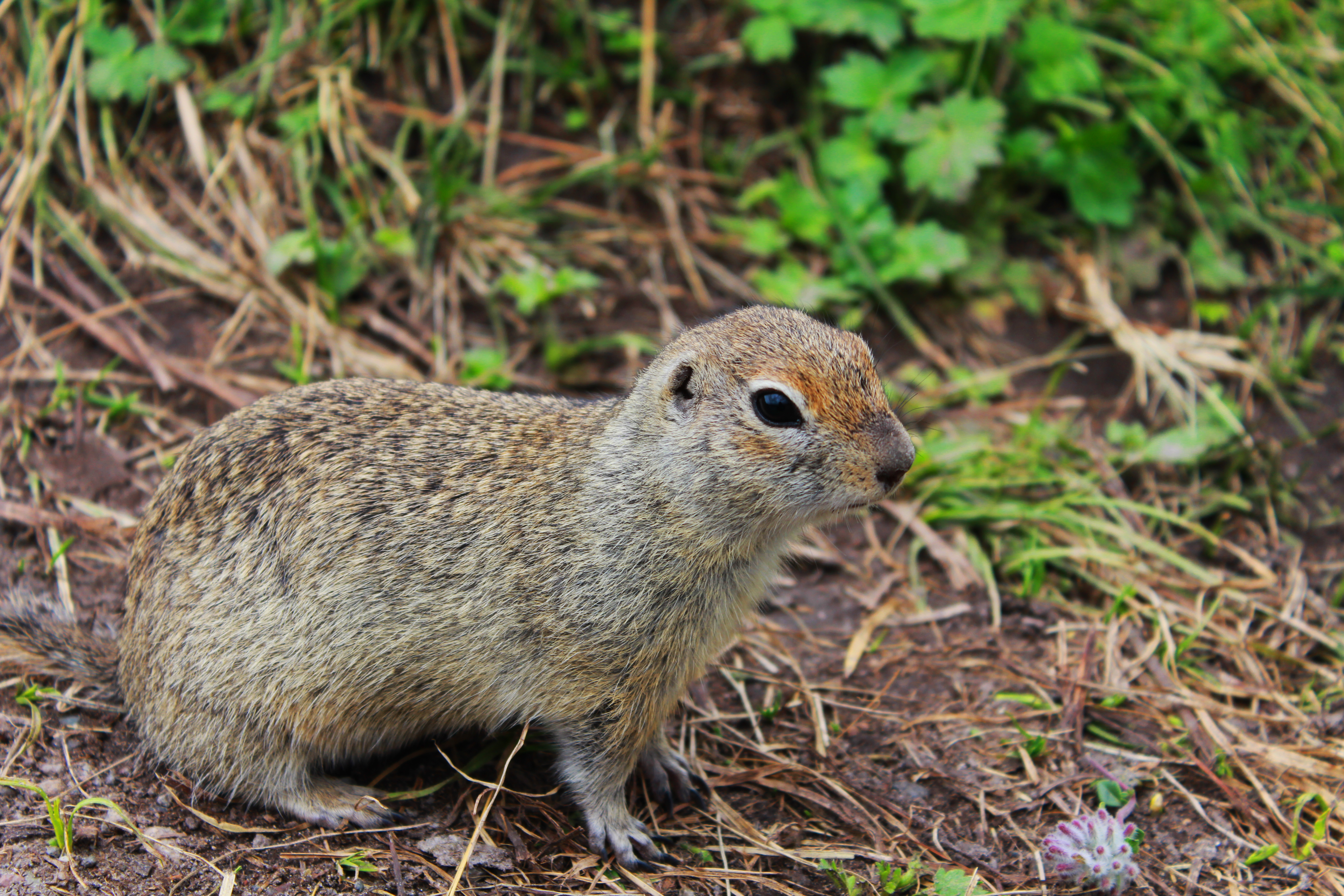

Conservation status
- Least Concern (IUCN 3.1)

Scientific classification
- Kingdom: Animalia
- Phylum: Chordata
- Class: Mammalia
- Order: Rodentia
- Family: Sciuridae
- Genus: Spermophilus
- Species: S. musicus

Binomial name
- Spermophilus musicus Ménétries, 1832

= Caucasian Mountain ground squirrel =

Species of rodent

The Caucasian Mountain ground squirrel (Spermophilus musicus) is a species of rodent in the family Sciuridae. Its taxonomic status has been the subject of much debate, and it has at times been treated as a subspecies of the little ground squirrel. It was formerly considered endemic to the North Caucasus (Kabardino-Balkaria and North Ossetia-Alania), but a 2024 analysis suggested that all populations of the little ground squirrel to the west of the Volga River should be included in this species. According to this definition, the Caucasian ground squirrel is widespread, ranging from Dagestan to Crimea and between the Dnieper and the Volga. It is not distributed in the Kuban, and the population in the North Caucasus (the population originally referred to as Spermophilus musicus) is isolated.

Despite its small range, Spermophilus musicus is considered a species of least concern by the IUCN Red List, as it is common within its range and the population is growing.
