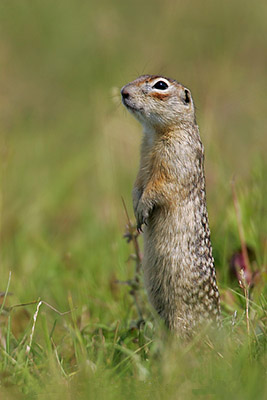

Conservation status
- Critically Endangered (IUCN 3.1)

Scientific classification
- Kingdom: Animalia
- Phylum: Chordata
- Class: Mammalia
- Order: Rodentia
- Family: Sciuridae
- Genus: Spermophilus
- Species: S. suslicus

Binomial name
- Spermophilus suslicus (Güldenstädt, 1770)

Subspecies
- S. s. boristhenicus S. s. guttatus S. s. suslicus
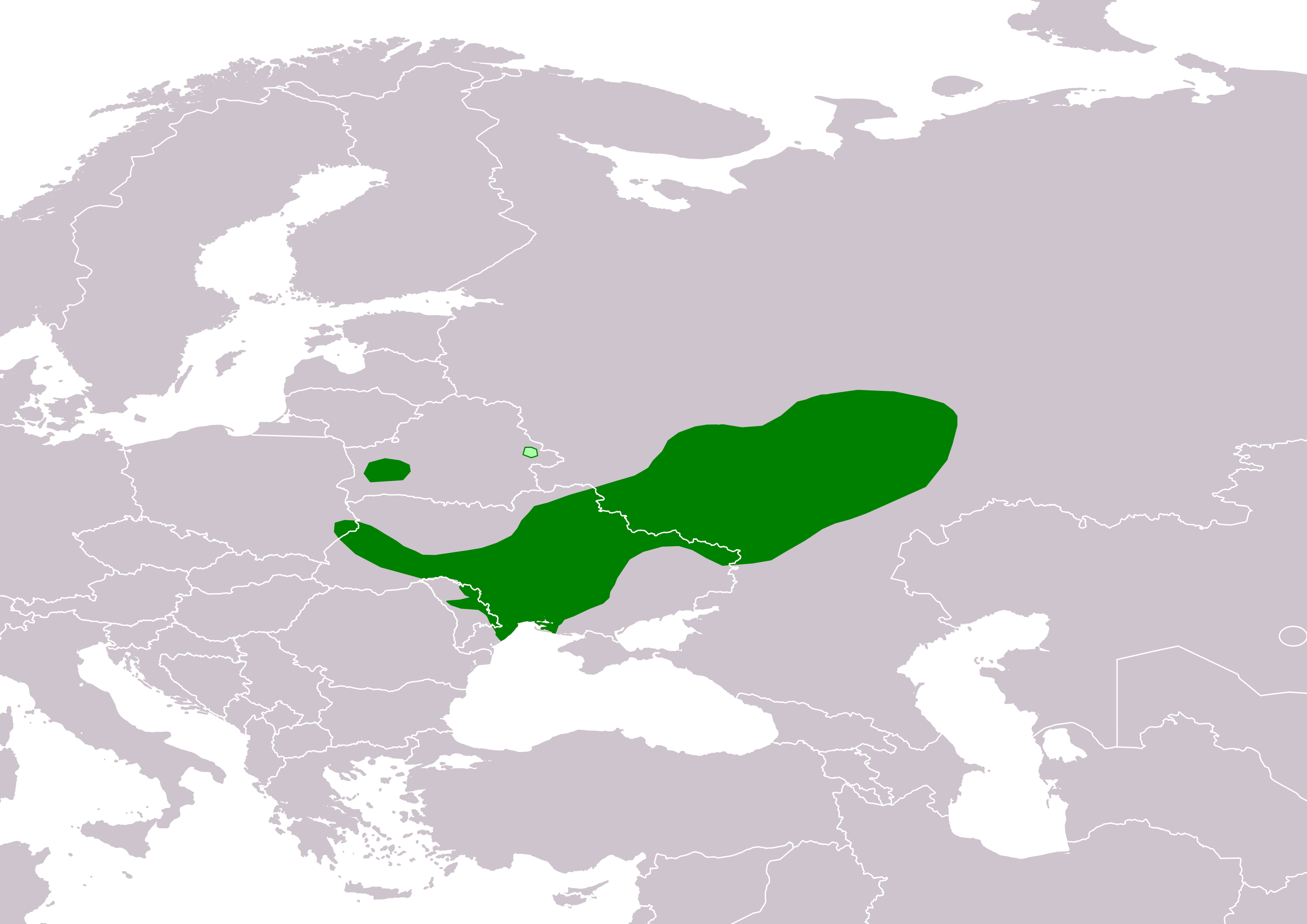
- Range of S. suslicus Resident Probably Extant, resident

= Speckled ground squirrel =

Species of rodent

The speckled ground squirrel or spotted souslik (Spermophilus suslicus) is a species of rodent in the family Sciuridae from Eastern Europe. Spermophilus suslicus consists of three subspecies: S. s. boristhenicus, S. s. guttatus, and S. s. suslicus. It is threatened by habitat loss.

== Taxonomy ==
Two populations separated geographically by the Dnieper River differ by diploid number, with those west of the Dnieper River, sometimes referred to as a sister species Spermophilus odessanus, having 36 chromosomes and those east, constituting Spermophilus suslicus sensu stricto, having 34. Recent molecular phylogenetic data indicate that Palearctic ground squirrels are a complex, diverse group due to extensive genetic introgression and incomplete lineage sorting since their recent speciation during the Pleistocene epoch and require multiple lines of evidence to distinguish their interpopulation relationships.

== Description ==
The speckled ground squirrel has dark-brown fur with white spots on its back and a short, thin tail. It grows to a length of 25 cm (10 in) and a weight of 280 g (10 oz). Its dental formula is 1.0.2.31.0.1.3. It is smaller and less social than many other ground squirrels of the genus Spermophilus.

== Distribution ==
It is found in Belarus, Moldova, Poland, European Russia, and Ukraine. Its natural habitat is temperate grassland and it is also found on cultivated ground. It is threatened by the loss and fragmentation of its habitat. Causes of habitat loss include the expansion of agriculture and forestry, the reduction of pasturing, the development and growth of cities, and industrial development. Also, in some areas it is hunted as an agricultural pest.

The speckled ground squirrel's range in Poland and southern Russia has contracted markedly, with only 10% of its area in the mid-twentieth century currently remaining. At the current rate of contraction of its range, the speckled ground squirrel will soon be extirpated from Poland.

== Behavior ==
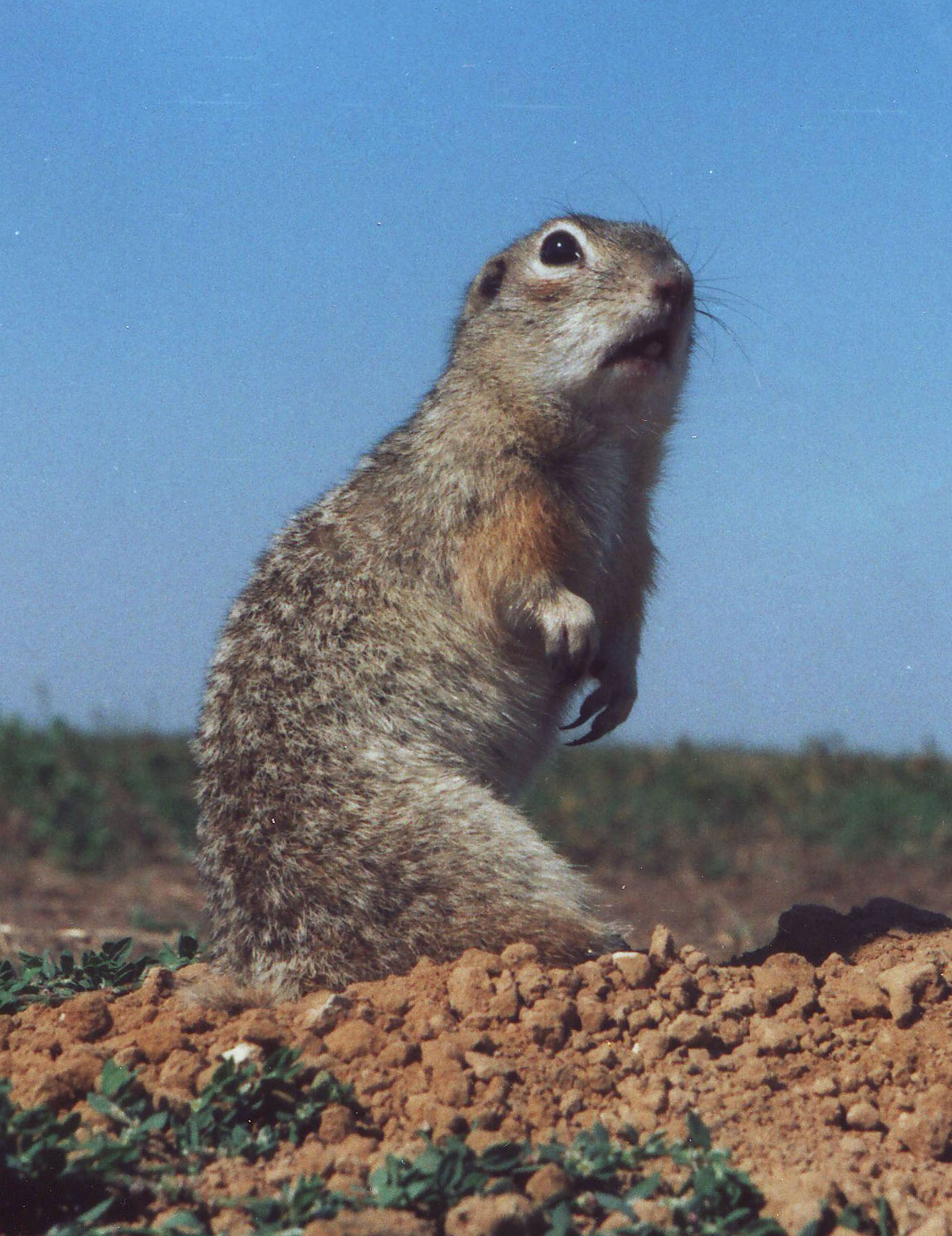
Individual in Odesa oblast, Ukraine

The speckled ground squirrel is a diurnal species which hibernates from October to April. It is active in the morning once the sun warms the area slightly, retreats to its underground den during the heat of the day, then reemerges late in the day for another feeding bout. It feeds mostly on grasses and cereals, although small vertebrates and arthropods are also eaten.

Compared with other Spermophilus species, it lives in a relatively closed habitat with high grasses that block visibility during its active seasons. Individuals live in separate burrows within a larger colony. These colonies can be up to over 160 individuals per ha. It mates between April and May. Gestation ranges from 23 to 26 days. Four to eight cubs are born per litter. Sporadic hybridization occurs where S. suslicus occurs sympatrically with the little (S. pygmaeus) and European ground squirrels (S. citellus).

== Predators ==
Though there have been no quantitative studies on all the predators of S. suslicus, the least weasel has been known to enter burrows and cause significant juvenile mortality, though it does not attack adults. However, conspecific predation may be more of a threat to the juvenile speckled ground squirrel than interspecific predators. Though infanticide in the wild has not yet been reported, the speckled ground squirrel has been infanticidal in captivity. The killer can be male, female, or both, and either eats the young or attacks and leaves it to die.

== Alarm call ==
The speckled ground squirrel uses alarm calls for a variety of purposes. Primarily, the alarm call is used to warn conspecific squirrels of predators and to alert predators that they've been detected. Individual-specific alarm calls have been seen in Spermophilus suslicus which also contain age-related features but they lack the ability to distinguish between familiar and unfamiliar individuals nor can they distinguish sex.

== Conservation ==
The population is believed to be experiencing continuing decline, with habitat fragmentation and loss occurring. In the 1996 IUCN Red List review, the speckled ground squirrel was listed as vulnerable, and in the 2008 and 2021 reviews, as near threatened. In the 2024 IUCN list update, it was listed as critically endangered, due to a 99% decline in the global population over the past 30 years. According to the IUCN, habitat destruction due to agricultural expansion, as well as climate change, puts the entire species at risk of extinction in the next 20–30 years.

A relict enclave population in Poland is protected under national law. The species is protected under Appendix II of the Bern Convention.
