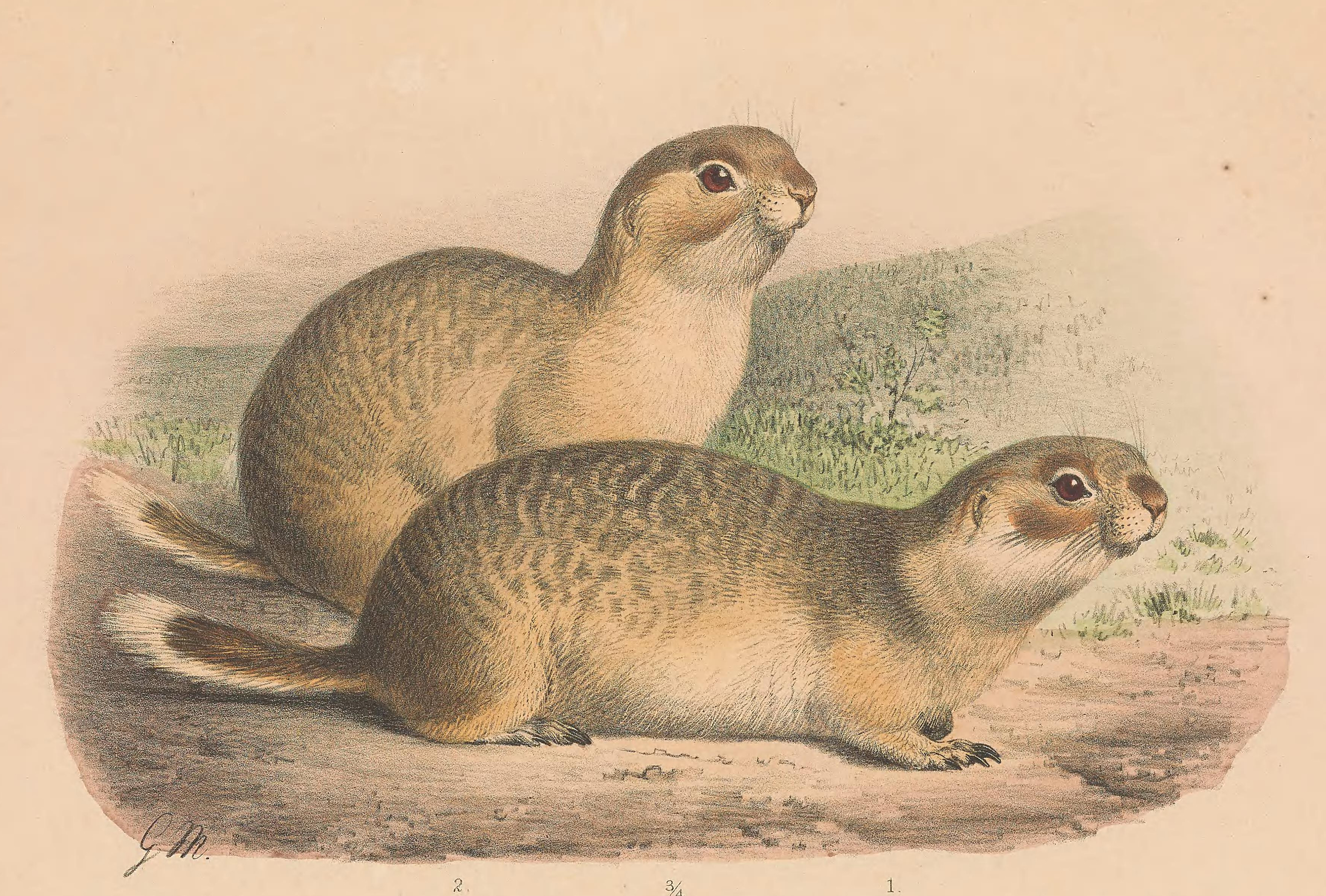

Conservation status
- Least Concern (IUCN 3.1)

Scientific classification
- Kingdom: Animalia
- Phylum: Chordata
- Class: Mammalia
- Order: Rodentia
- Family: Sciuridae
- Genus: Spermophilus
- Species: S. erythrogenys

Binomial name
- Spermophilus erythrogenys Brandt, 1841

= Red-cheeked ground squirrel =

Species of rodent

The red-cheeked ground squirrel (Spermophilus erythrogenys) is a species of rodent in the family Sciuridae. It is commonly referred to as the red-cheeked ground souslik and there are several recognized subspecies. It is found in central Asia. Spermophilus brunnescens (Belyaev, 1943), Spermophilus heptneri (Vasil'eva, 1964) and Spermophilus ungae (Martino, 1923) are accepted as synonyms. There is some controversy over whether Spermophilus pallidicauda and Spermophilus brevicauda should be regarded as synonyms or full species.

== Characteristics ==
The red-cheeked ground squirrel has a stout, low-slung body supported by short legs and a well-furred tail measuring about a third the length of the body. It has internal cheek pouches for carrying food. The head, neck and body are varying shades of grayish brown and there is a reddish-ochre patch on the bridge of the nose.

== Distribution ==
The red-cheeked ground squirrel is distributed across the territory of the former Soviet Union, in Kazakhstan, Altai and Western Siberia, Mongolia and China (Xinjiang province). It inhabits steppes, forest-steppes, deserts and semi-deserts, favouring pastures, fallow lands, road sides and uncultivated land. In mountainous regions the species is found up to 2,100 metres (6,890 ft) above sea level.

== Ecology ==
Behaviour and daily activity varies greatly across the distribution range. Hibernation occurs in some areas and aestivation in others. This species is diurnal and feeds on the green parts of plants, seeds and roots. The burrows have permanent vertical entrances and temporary slanting ones. They are up to 2.8 metres (9 ft) in depth with the tunnels totalling up to 4.75 metres (16 ft). 100 holes and 15-20 individuals have been recorded on 1 hectare (2.5 acres). Reproduction rates vary depending on the weather conditions and are reduced during a prolonged cold spring. There are 2 to 12 young in a litter, typically 7 to 9. These ground squirrels are abundant and considered to be pests in parts of their range. They are hunted for meat and skins for local trade but their population is stable and adjudged to be of least concern in the IUCN Red List of Threatened Species.
