= Osmanius =

Scientific classification
- Kingdom: Animalia
- Phylum: Arthropoda
- Clade: Pancrustacea
- Class: Insecta
- Order: Coleoptera
- Suborder: Polyphaga
- Infraorder: Scarabaeiformia
- Family: Scarabaeidae
- Subfamily: Aphodiinae
- Tribe: Aphodiini
- Genus: Osmanius; Branco & Baraud, 1988

Genus of beetles

Osmanius is a genus of beetles of the family Scarabaeidae.

== Species ==
- Osmanius balthasari (Petrovitz, 1963)
- Osmanius dellacasai (Petrovitz, 1970)
- Osmanius persicus Branco & Baraud, 1988
