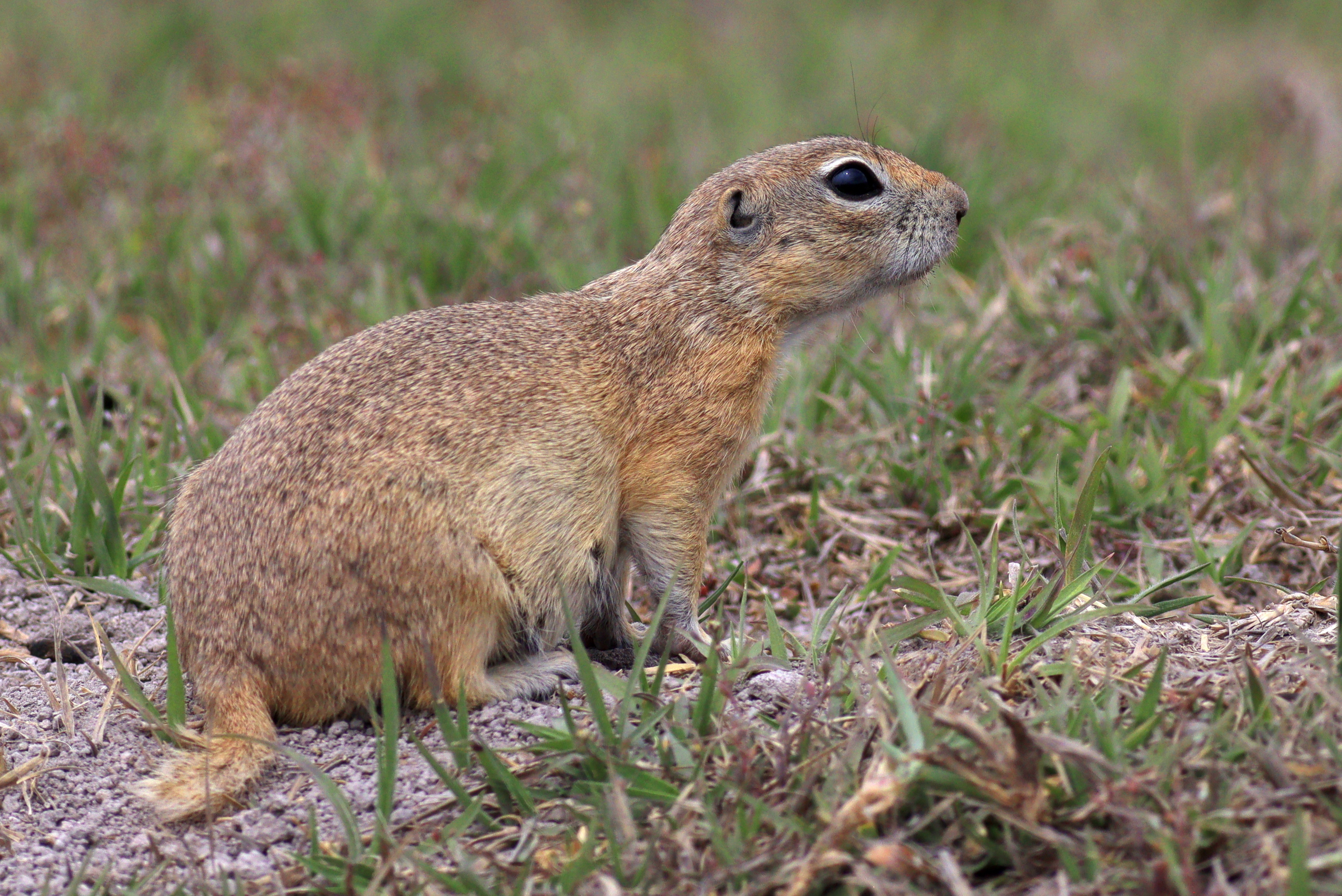

Conservation status
- Near Threatened (IUCN 3.1)

Scientific classification
- Kingdom: Animalia
- Phylum: Chordata
- Class: Mammalia
- Order: Rodentia
- Family: Sciuridae
- Genus: Spermophilus
- Species: S. xanthoprymnus

Binomial name
- Spermophilus xanthoprymnus (Bennett, 1835)

= Asia Minor ground squirrel =

Species of rodent

The Asia Minor ground squirrel (Spermophilus xanthoprymnus), also known as Anatolian souslik, Anatolian ground squirrel, is a species of rodent in the family Sciuridae. It is found in Armenia, Iran, and Turkey. The scientific name roughly translates as "seed-lover with yellow underparts".

== Description ==
Like many other ground squirrels, the Asia Minor species has a rounded body and head, with short limbs and tail. Males, at 25 to 29 centimetres (9.8 to 11.4 in) in total length and 235 to 490 grams (8.3 to 17.3 oz) in weight, are noticeably larger than females at 23 to 28 centimetres (9.1 to 11.0 in) and 170 to 410 grams (6.0 to 14.5 oz). The tail is 3 to 6 centimetres (1.2 to 2.4 in) long.

The fur is uniform in colour over most of the body, and does not have the darker markings found in neighbouring species such as the European souslik. Asia Minor ground squirrels are typically buff in colour, but may vary from greyish to dark brown. The underside and limbs are somewhat paler than the rest of the body, often being yellowish in colour. The only clear markings are narrow white rings around the eyes, and a white patch on the chin and throat. Females have eight or ten teats, and both sexes possess scent-producing anal glands.

== Distribution, habitat, and diet ==
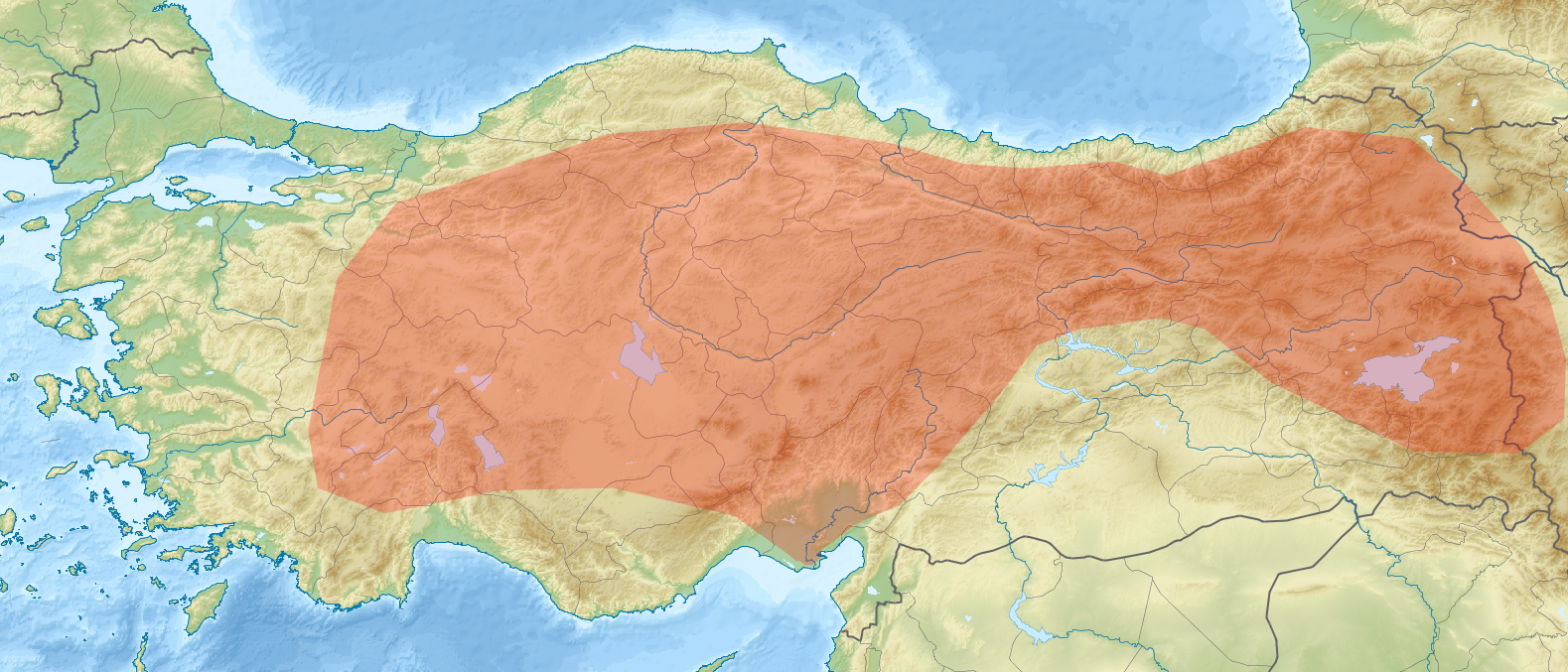
Distribution

Asia Minor ground squirrels are found throughout central and eastern Anatolia in Turkey, extending into Iran and Armenia at the very eastern edge of their range. Small, isolated populations have also been identified in the Antalya and Çukurova plain regions of southern Anatolia, but the species is otherwise absent from near-coastal regions and from European Turkey. They inhabit steppe country and alpine meadows, between 800 and 2,900 metres (2,600 and 9,500 ft) elevation.

Although two subspecies of Asia Minor ground squirrel were formerly recognised, inhabiting the northwest highlands and the central lowlands of Anatolia, respectively, there seems to be little scientific evidence to support their distinct identities.

They feed primarily on seeds, leaves, and shoots of hardy plants such as cocklebur, star-thistle, shepherd's purse, mustard, wild onion, speedwell, and wild grains, in addition to domesticated crops. Although primarily herbivorous, they may also eat small invertebrates. Because of the relatively arid nature of the preferred habitat, they rarely, if ever, drink free-standing water, obtaining all they need from their diet. Natural predators include eagle owls, buzzards, falcons, and red foxes.

== Behaviour ==
Asia Minor ground squirrels are diurnal, burrowing, animals, that hibernate through the winter. Their regular burrows are simple tunnels about 21 to 57 centimetres (8.3 to 22.4 in) deep. However, burrows used for nesting or hibernation may be as deep as 219 centimetres (86 in), and may have additional entrances and deep nesting and food storage chambers. They generally hibernate from September to March, although the exact timing depends on the local climate. Hibernation in the Asia Minor ground squirrel consists of bouts of torpor lasting up to a couple of weeks, during which the body temperature drops by 10 degrees Celsius or more, separated by brief periods of arousal.

== Reproduction ==
Asia Minor ground squirrels mate underground shortly after emerging from hibernation in March or April. During the mating season, males travel between several females, and may fight with each other for access to mates. The females produce a single litter of three to nine (although most commonly four or five) young each year, and gestation lasts around 25 days. The young are born blind and hairless, weighing 5 to 7 grams (0.18 to 0.25 oz). The fur begins to appear at 15 days, and the eyes open at 22–25 days. By four weeks of age, they begin to leave the burrow, and they are fully weaned by seven weeks.

== Evolution ==
Fossils of Asia Minor ground squirrels are known from the early Pleistocene, and include some specimens from as far west as Chios, suggesting that the species formerly had a wider distribution than it does today.

Biochemical studies indicate that the species diverged from the common ancestor of the European souslik and the Taurus ground squirrel, its closest living relatives, around five million years ago. This coincides with the formation of the Bosporus, and the subsequent separation of Anatolia from Europe, during the late Miocene. During the last ice age, they may have survived in small mountain refugia in the Anatolian region.

== Conservation ==
Because Asia Minor ground squirrels will consume agricultural grains when they are available, they are considered a pest in many areas, and may be poisoned. In consequence, the increase of agriculture in central Anatolia led to declines of as much as 20–25% in ground squirrel populations over the first decade of the twenty-first century. Given this decline the International Union for Conservation of Nature re-classified the Asia Minor ground squirrel as "Near Threatened" in the 2009 edition of the IUCN Red List; the species previously having been considered as of Least Concern. Asia Minor ground squirrels also have legal protection in the Republic of Turkey.
