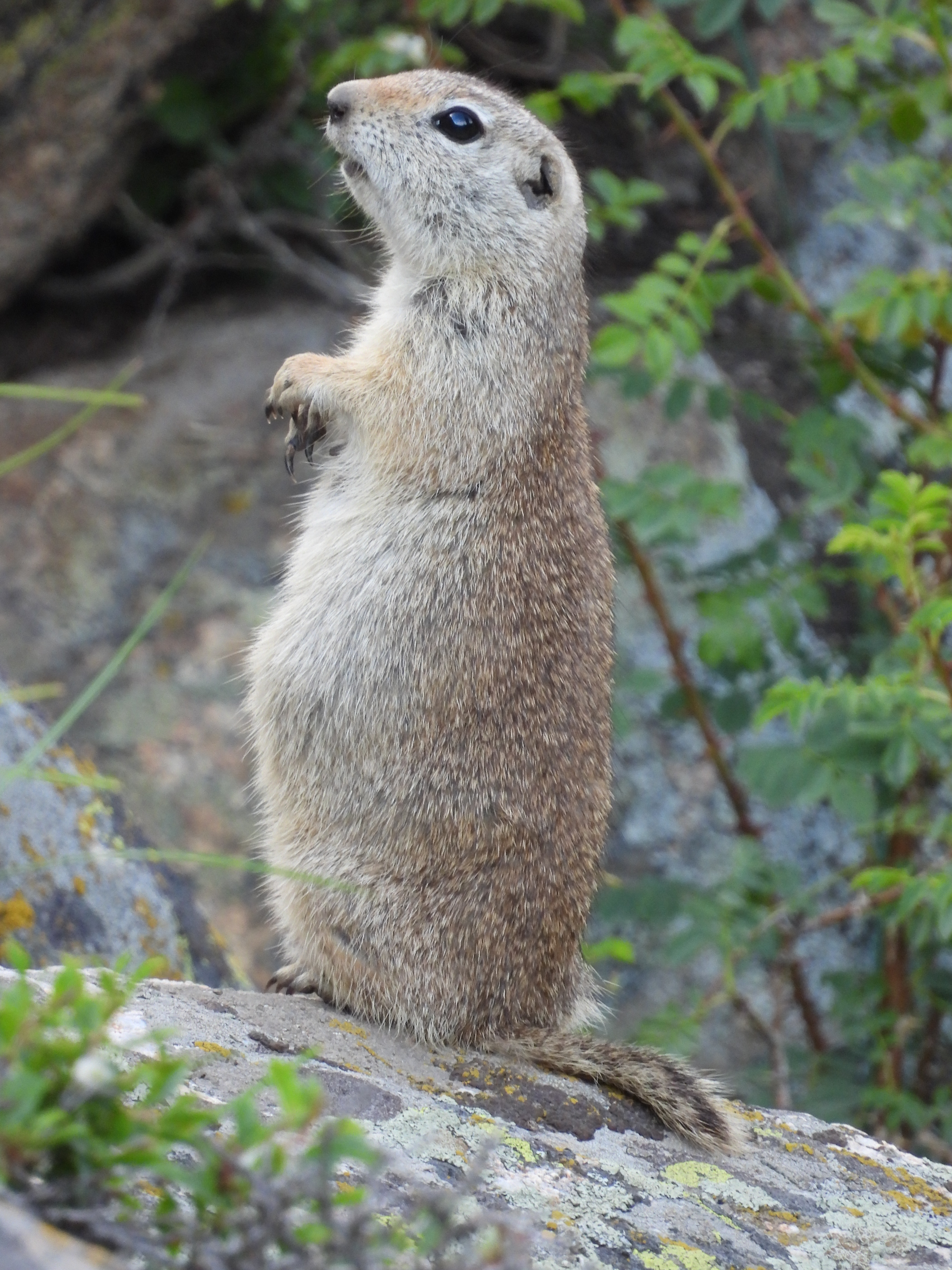

Conservation status
- Least Concern (IUCN 3.1)

Scientific classification
- Kingdom: Animalia
- Phylum: Chordata
- Class: Mammalia
- Order: Rodentia
- Family: Sciuridae
- Genus: Spermophilus
- Species: S. relictus

Binomial name
- Spermophilus relictus (Kashkarov, 1923)

Synonyms
- Citellus relictus Urocitellus relictus Spermophilus ralli (Kuznetsov, 1948)

= Relict ground squirrel =

Species of rodent

The relict ground squirrel (Spermophilus relictus) is a species of rodent in the family Sciuridae. It is found in Kazakhstan, Kyrgyzstan and Uzbekistan. It is thought to be synonymous with Spermophilus ralli, whose name was formerly used for the Tian Shan ground squirrel (S. nilkaensis).
