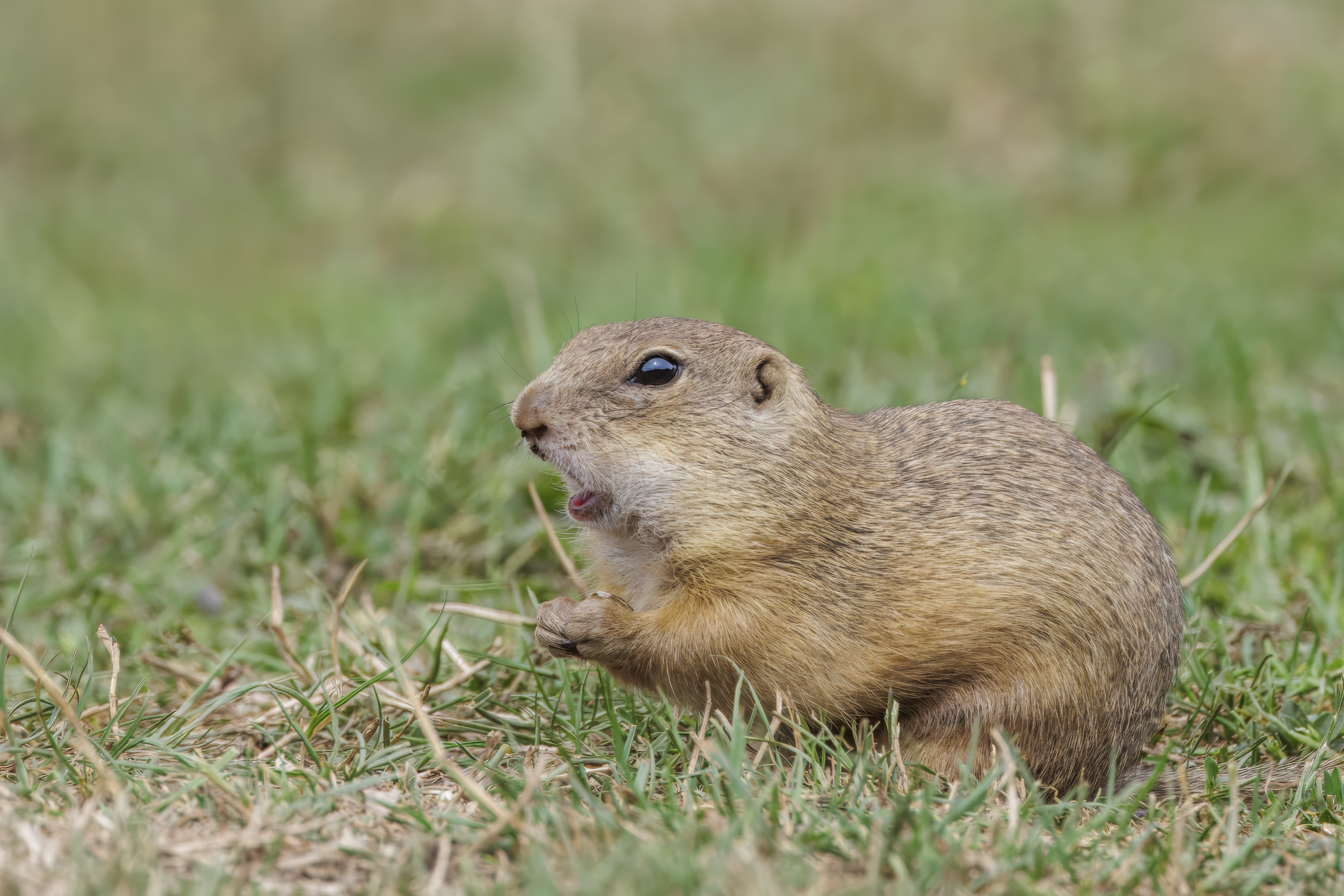
- Spermophilus citellus

Scientific classification
- Kingdom: Animalia
- Phylum: Chordata
- Class: Mammalia
- Order: Rodentia
- Family: Sciuridae
- Tribe: Marmotini
- Genus: Spermophilus; F. Cuvier, 1825

Type species
- Mus citellus Linnaeus, 1766

Species
- See text.

= Spermophilus =

Spermophilus Temporal range: Late Miocene - Recent

Genus of rodents

Spermophilus, also known as the Old World ground squirrels, sousliks or, sometimes, spermophiles, is an Old World genus of ground squirrels in the squirrel family (Sciuridae). Formerly, the genus was more species rich, but it has since been reduced to contain only species from Eurasia, with many former species having been moved to other genera. The 18 known species are distributed across the Eurasian steppe belt and adjacent regions between Central Europe and Manchuria. They inhabit steppe and comparable short grassland habitats, including airports, as well semi-deserts and, in some cases, agricultural fields. Their diet is dominated by seeds, grasses, forbs, roots and tubers, but may also include small invertebrates. Spermophilus live in colonial burrows, and spend much of the year in hibernation and, in dry regions, aestivation.

== Etymology ==
Some species are called susliks (or sousliks), which comes from Russian суслик, suslik. In some languages, a variation of the name is in common usage, for example suseł in Polish, or Ziesel in German, all of which probably ultimately descend from a common Proto-Slavic root. The scientific name of this genus means "seed-lovers" (gr. σπέρμα sperma, genitive σπέρματος spermatos – seed; φίλος philos – friend, lover).

== Ecology and behavior ==
As typical ground squirrels, Spermophilus live in open habitats like grasslands, meadows, steppe and semideserts throughout the Eurasian steppe and adjacent regions, feed on the low plants, and use burrows as nests and refuge. They are diurnal and mostly live in colonies, although some species also can occur singly. They are found in both lowlands to highlands, hibernate during the colder months (up to c. 8 1/2 months each year in some species) and in arid regions they may also aestivate during the summer or fall. The distributions of the various species are mostly separated, often by large rivers or mountain ranges, although there are regions inhabited by as many as three species and rarely two species may even form mixed colonies. Generally, however, interspecific competition is intense and thus, sufficient differences in size (as per Hutchinson's rule) seem to be a necessary precondition for sympatry. A few species are known to hybridize where their ranges come into contact.

In contrast to most other, smaller grassland rodents, such as voles, gerbils or the steppe pika, but like other ground squirrels, Spermophilus are mainly active during the day, and rely on their good vision and their agility to detect and evade predators. Therefore, Spermophilus require open and low-growing habitats, and can cope well even with overgrazing. On the contrary, dense vegetation makes them vulnerable to predation by their many predators, including the steppe and eastern imperial eagles, and steppe and marbled polecats, often rendering them dependent on the presence of large grazing animals. Like other colonial ground squirrels, Spermophilus use high-pitched calls to communicate and warn colony members of predators.

== Appearance ==
Spermophilus are overall yellowish, light orangish, light brownish or greyish. Although many are inconspicuously mottled or spotted, or have orange markings on the head, overall they lack strong patterns, except in S. suslicus and S. odessanus, which commonly have brown upperparts with clear white spotting. Size varies with species and they have a head-and-body length of c. 17–40 cm (6.7–15.7 in). Before hibernation the largest S. fulvus may weigh up to 2 kg (4.4 lb) and the largest S. major up to almost 1.4 kg (3.1 lb), but they always weigh much less earlier in the year and other species are considerably smaller, mostly less than 0.5 kg (1.1 lb) even in peak condition before hibernation. All have a fairly short tail that—depending on exact species—is around 10–45% of the length of the head-and-body.

== Taxonomy ==
As traditionally defined the genus was very species-rich, ranging through Europe, Asia and North America, but this arrangement was found to be paraphyletic to the certainly distinct prairie dogs (Cynomys), marmots (Marmota), and antelope squirrels (Ammospermophilus). As a consequence, all the former Spermophilus species of North America have been moved to other genera, leaving the European and Asian species as true Spermophilus (the only exceptions being the two Asian Urocitellus species). The exact relations between these clades are slightly unclear. According to Simonov et al. (2024), Spermophilus consists of 18 species. Also according to this study, the genus can be divided into four major clades that diverged during the Late Miocene.

Clade	Image	Name	Common name	Distribution
East Asian clade		Spermophilus alashanicus	Alashan ground squirrel	Northern China west of the Yellow River.
East Asian clade		Spermophilus dauricus	Daurian ground squirrel	Northern China and Manchuria between the Yellow River and the Amur River.
Pygmaeus clade		Spermophilus musicus	Caucasus Mountain ground squirrel	Southern Pontic-Caspian steppe between the Dnieper and Volga rivers; Crimea.
Pygmaeus clade		Spermophilus pygmaeus	Little ground squirrel	Northern Central Asia east of the Volga.
Europe/Asia Minor clade		Spermophilus citellus	European ground squirrel	Balkan Peninsula to the Czech Republic and Poland, Moldova and western Ukraine.
Europe/Asia Minor clade		Spermophilus odessanus	Polonian ground squirrel	Eastern Europe between the Carpathian Mountains and the Dnieper River.
Europe/Asia Minor clade		Spermophilus suslicus	Speckled ground squirrel	Northern Pontic steppe between the Dnieper and Volga rivers.
Europe/Asia Minor clade		Spermophilus taurensis	Taurus ground squirrel	South-central Anatolia.
Europe/Asia Minor clade		Spermophilus xanthoprymnus	Anatolian ground squirrel	South-western, central and eastern Anatolia; Armenian highlands.
Colobotis clade		Spermophilus brevicauda	Brandt's ground squirrel	Border region between Kazakhstan and China along the Tian Shan.
Colobotis clade		Spermophilus erythrogenys	Red-cheeked ground squirrel	Western Siberia between the Irtysh and Ob rivers.
Colobotis clade		Spermophilus fulvus	Yellow ground squirrel	Central Asia and the northern Iranian Plateau.
Colobotis clade		Spermophilus major	Russet ground squirrel	Ural Mountains between the Volga and Tobol rivers.
Colobotis clade		Spermophilus pallicauda	Pale-bellied ground squirrel	Mongolia and Gobi Desert Altai Mountains.
Colobotis clade		Spermophilus nilkaensis	Tian Shan ground squirrel	Endemic to the Tian Shan.
Colobotis clade		Spermophilus relictus	Relict ground squirrel	Central Asia between the Tian Shan and the Pamir Mountains.
Colobotis clade		Spermophilus seleveni		Central Asia between the Tobol and Irtysh rivers, Lake Balkhash and the Tian Shan.
Colobotis clade		Spermophilus vorontsovi		Western Siberia between the Ob and the Kuznetsk Alatau Mountains.

=== Extinct species ===
Discovery and examination of one of the best preserved Eurasian ground squirrel fossils yet recovered allowed the study of many previously unknown aspects of ground squirrel cranial anatomy, and prompted a critical reassessment of their phylogenetic position. As a result, three Pleistocene species previously considered members of the Urocitellus genus were moved to Spermophilus:

- †Spermophilus nogaici
- †Spermophilus polonicus
- †Spermophilus primigenius

In addition to the recent species, three now-extinct species are known from the Pleistocene of Europe:

Spermophilus citelloides is known from the Middle Pleistocene to early Holocene of central Europe. It appears to be most closely related to the living S. suslicus.

Spermophilus severskensis is known from the late Pleistocene (Weichselian) of the Desna area, Ukraine. It appears to have been a highly specialised grazer and close relative of the living S. pygmaeus.

Spermophilus superciliosus is known from the Middle Pleistocene to reportedly the early 20th century, with a vast range across much of Europe, from southern England to the Volga and the Ural Mountains. It was similar in size to the recent S. major, and a probable ancestor of S. fulvus.

== Relationship with humans ==
Ground squirrels may carry fleas that transmit diseases to humans (see Black Death), and have been destructive in tunneling underneath human habitation.
