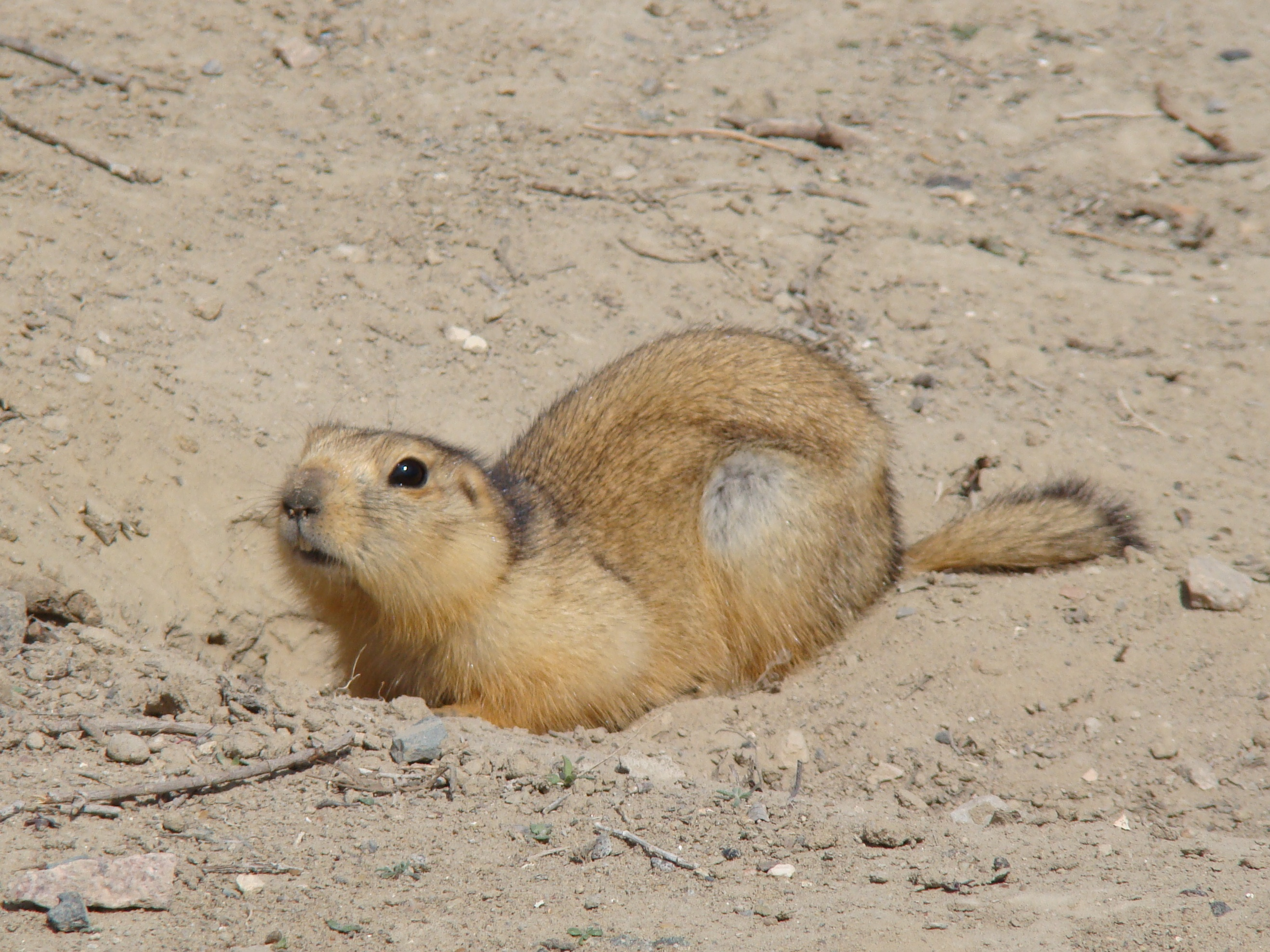

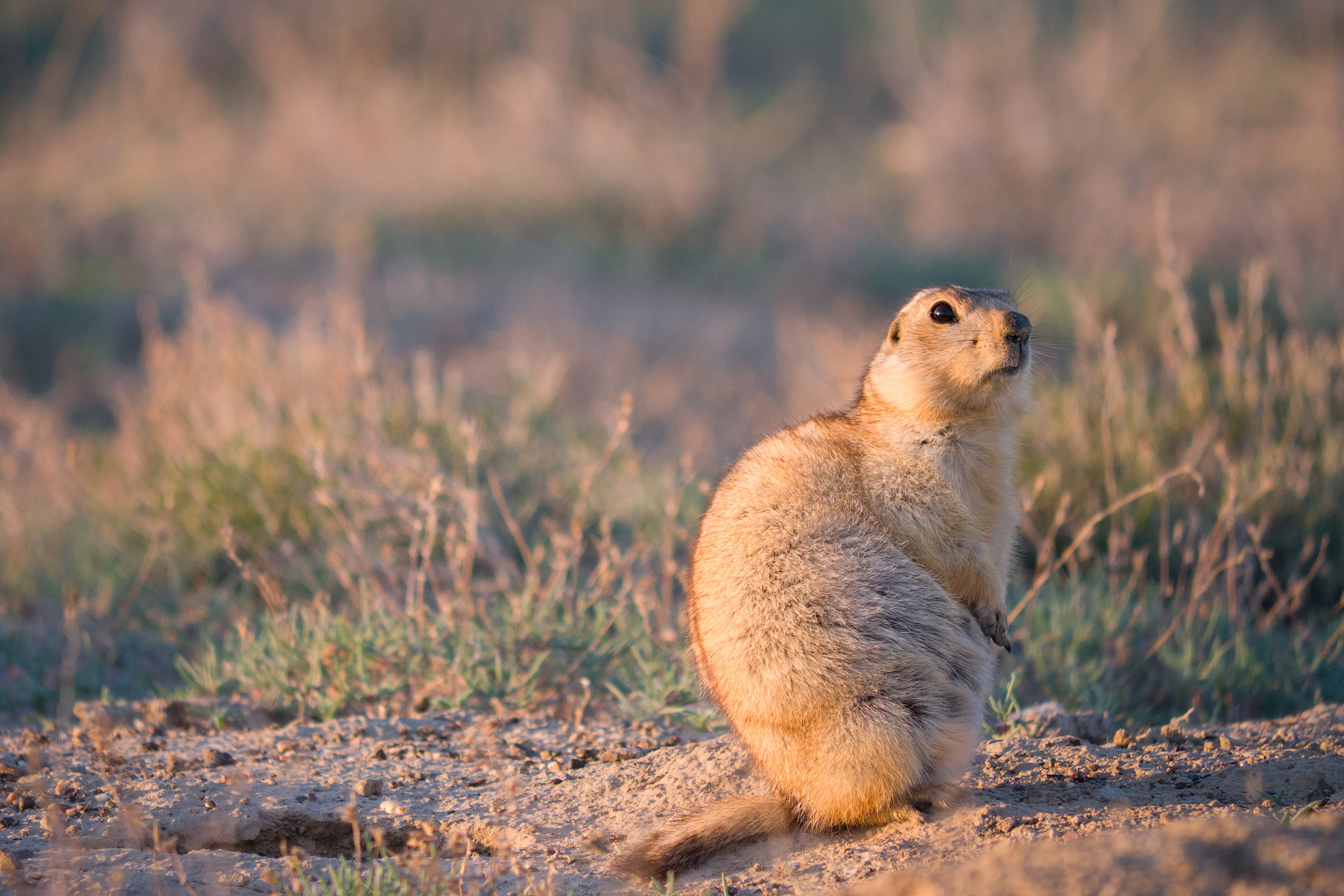

Conservation status
- Least Concern (IUCN 3.1)

Scientific classification
- Kingdom: Animalia
- Phylum: Chordata
- Class: Mammalia
- Order: Rodentia
- Family: Sciuridae
- Genus: Spermophilus
- Species: S. fulvus

Binomial name
- Spermophilus fulvus (Lichtenstein, 1823)

= Yellow ground squirrel =

Species of rodent

The yellow ground squirrel (Spermophilus fulvus) is a large and sturdy ground squirrel species native to Afghanistan, China, Iran, Kazakhstan, Tajikistan, Turkmenistan, Uzbekistan and Russia. It inhabits sandy steppes with Artemisia, glasswort and tamarisk.

The yellow ground squirrel has naked soles on the hind feet excluding heels. It lives in large colonies, is strictly diurnal and forages mainly in the morning when the vegetation is still damp. Its diet includes bulbs, seeds, stems and leaves. It hibernates, but it may also aestivate.
