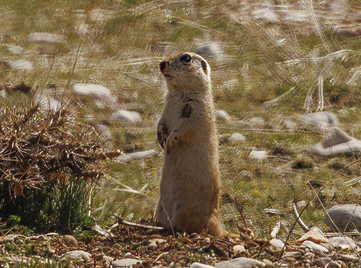

Conservation status
- Least Concern (IUCN 3.1)

Scientific classification
- Kingdom: Animalia
- Phylum: Chordata
- Class: Mammalia
- Order: Rodentia
- Family: Sciuridae
- Genus: Spermophilus
- Species: S. taurensis

Binomial name
- Spermophilus taurensis Gündüz et al. 2007

Synonyms
- Spermophilus torosensis Ozkurt et al. 2007

= Taurus ground squirrel =

Species of rodent

The Taurus ground squirrel (Spermophilus taurensis) is a species of rodent in the family Sciuridae. It is endemic to the Taurus Mountains of south-central Anatolia. It was first identified as a distinct species to the Asia Minor ground squirrel in 2007.
