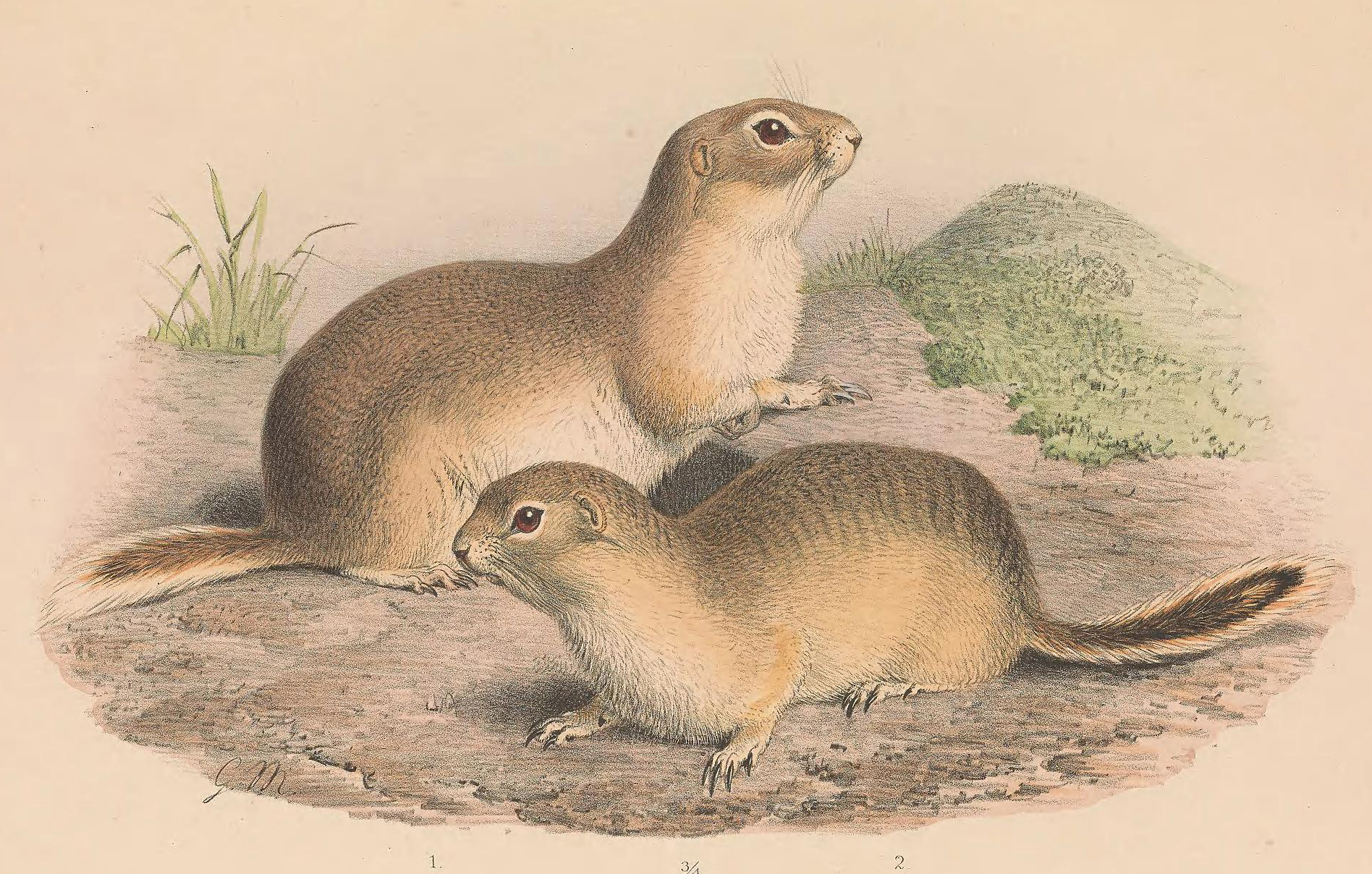

Conservation status
- Least Concern (IUCN 3.1)

Scientific classification
- Kingdom: Animalia
- Phylum: Chordata
- Class: Mammalia
- Order: Rodentia
- Family: Sciuridae
- Genus: Spermophilus
- Species: S. alashanicus

Binomial name
- Spermophilus alashanicus (Büchner, 1888)

= Alashan ground squirrel =

Species of rodent

The Alashan ground squirrel (Spermophilus alashanicus) is a species of squirrel. It is native to China and Mongolia.

This squirrel lives at elevations up to 3200 meters. It lives on the steppe and in foothills and alpine meadows. In China it can be found in desert habitat. It is associated with the plant species Amygdalus pedunculata and A. polyrrhizum.

This species is 22 to 23 centimetres (8.7 to 9.1 in) long. It is brown or gray with a pale underside. In the summer it develops a chestnut wash along the shoulders. Most babies are born in June, with litter sizes ranging from one to nine.
