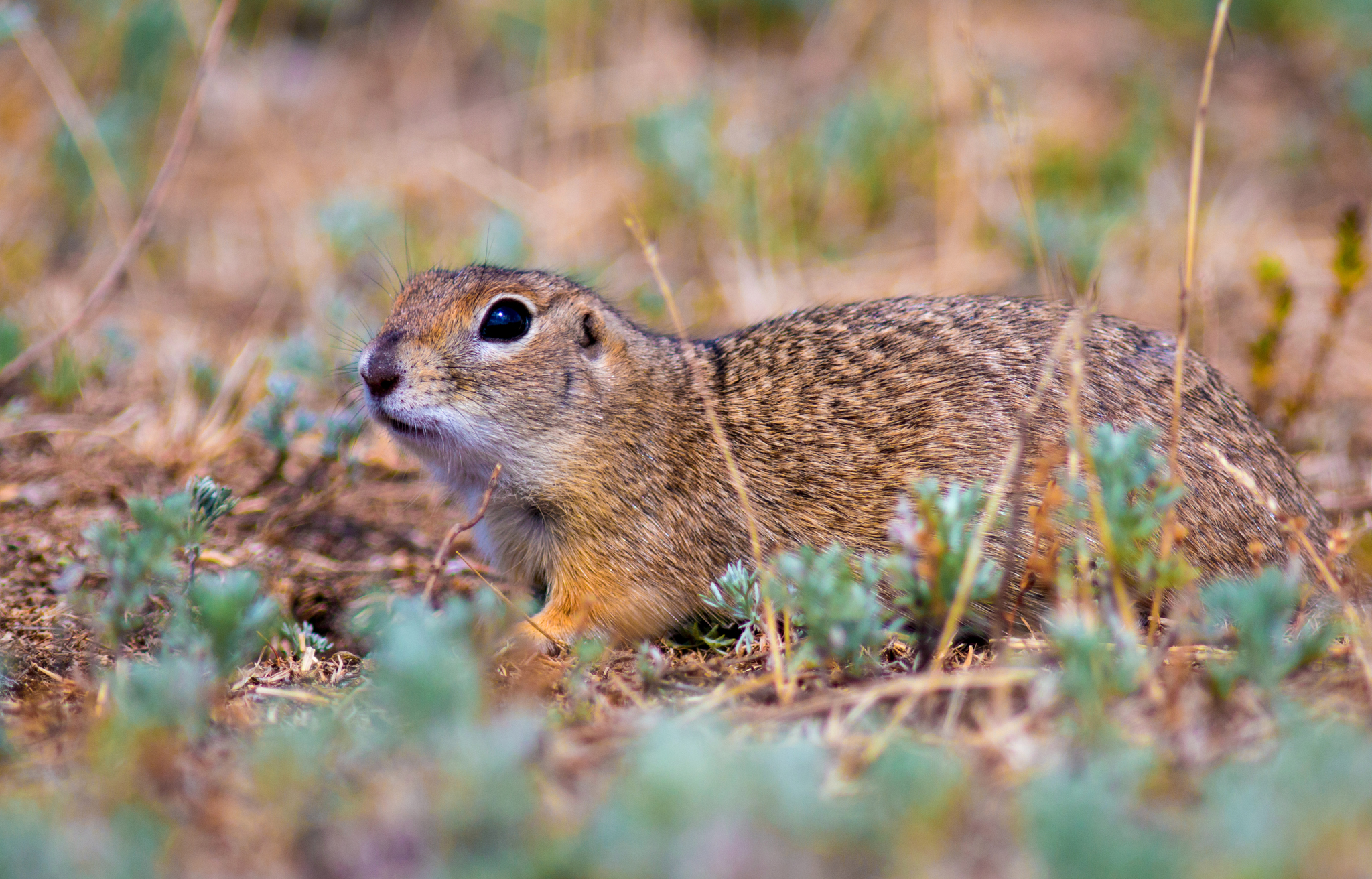

Conservation status
- Least Concern (IUCN 3.1)

Scientific classification
- Kingdom: Animalia
- Phylum: Chordata
- Class: Mammalia
- Order: Rodentia
- Family: Sciuridae
- Genus: Spermophilus
- Species: S. pygmaeus

Binomial name
- Spermophilus pygmaeus (Pallas, 1778)

= Little ground squirrel =

Species of rodent

The little ground squirrel or little souslik (Spermophilus pygmaeus) is a species of rodent in the family Sciuridae. It is found from Eastern Europe to Central Asia.

Its subspecies include Spermophilus pygmaeus pygmaeus, Spermophilus pygmaeus brauneri, Spermophilus pygmaeus herbicolus and Spermophilus pygmaeus mugosaricus. The Caucasian mountain ground squirrel (Spermophilus musicus) is now considered to be a separate species.

== Morphology ==
The little ground squirrel has a stout, low-slung body, short legs and a well-furred tail. It has a brownish-grey back with ochre and yellowish mottling. The head is notably darker with more intense ochre tones and the tail is a light, grayish-ochre color with a pale tip. The body length is up to 230 millimetres and the tail measures up to 40 millimetres.

== Distribution ==
The little ground squirrel inhabits steppes and semi-deserts in Eastern Europe and Central Asia, ranging from Ukraine and European Russia east as far as the Aral Sea (Kazakhstan) and Dagestan (Russia). It is found at altitudes of up to 500 metres. The range of the species has been reduced over the last 20 years, probably as a result of climate change with more wet weather and wet years in the region. A decrease in cattle grazing and arable farming may also have played a role.

== Biology ==
This species is diurnal and favours grassland, uncultivated ground, field edges and roadside verges, avoiding areas with dense long vegetation. It lives in colonies mostly consisting of non-overlapping territories of adult females, while male territories include several female territories. It builds permanent burrows for hibernation and reproduction and temporary burrows for shelter. Before hibernation, all exits from the burrow are plugged by soil. In March or April the entrances are opened, the burrows cleaned and new construction starts. In late June or July, aestivation occurs and sometimes, especially in dry years, this species goes straight from aestivation to hibernation. During the year it may only be active for 80 to 100 days. As a result of excavating activity over several years, a mound is formed on the surface of the ground, up to eight metres in diameter and 0.6 of a metre in height. This is known as a souslikovina and from the top, animals keep watch on their surroundings. When threatened they emit a sharp, singing sound and retreat into the safety of the burrow.

The diet consists of green vegetation, roots and seeds. In years when food is scarce the little ground squirrel may migrate to seek better supplies elsewhere. Reproduction occurs once a year and the number of females participating in reproduction varies depending on the nature of the spring weather and the physiological condition of the females resulting from the adequacy of food supplies during the previous year. Litter sizes vary between three and ten per brood. The population dynamics are determined by many factors including changes of climate that are occurring in the area, the sufficiency of fodder, and the natural death rate which may be high, especially among young animals during hibernation.
