= List of mammals of Macau =

This is a list of the mammal species recorded in Macau. There are 83 mammal species in Macau.

The following tags are used to highlight each species' conservation status as assessed by the International Union for Conservation of Nature:

LC	Least concern	There are no current identifiable risks to the species.
DD	Data deficient	There is not enough information to know the population status
NT	Near threatened	This species is close to qualifying/likely to qualify for a threatened category in the future
VU	Vulnerable	This species is considered to be facing a high risk of extinction
EN	Endangered	This species is considered to be facing a very high risk of extinction
CR	Critically endangered	This species is considered to be facing an extremely high risk of extinction

== Order: Sirenia (manatees and dugongs) ==
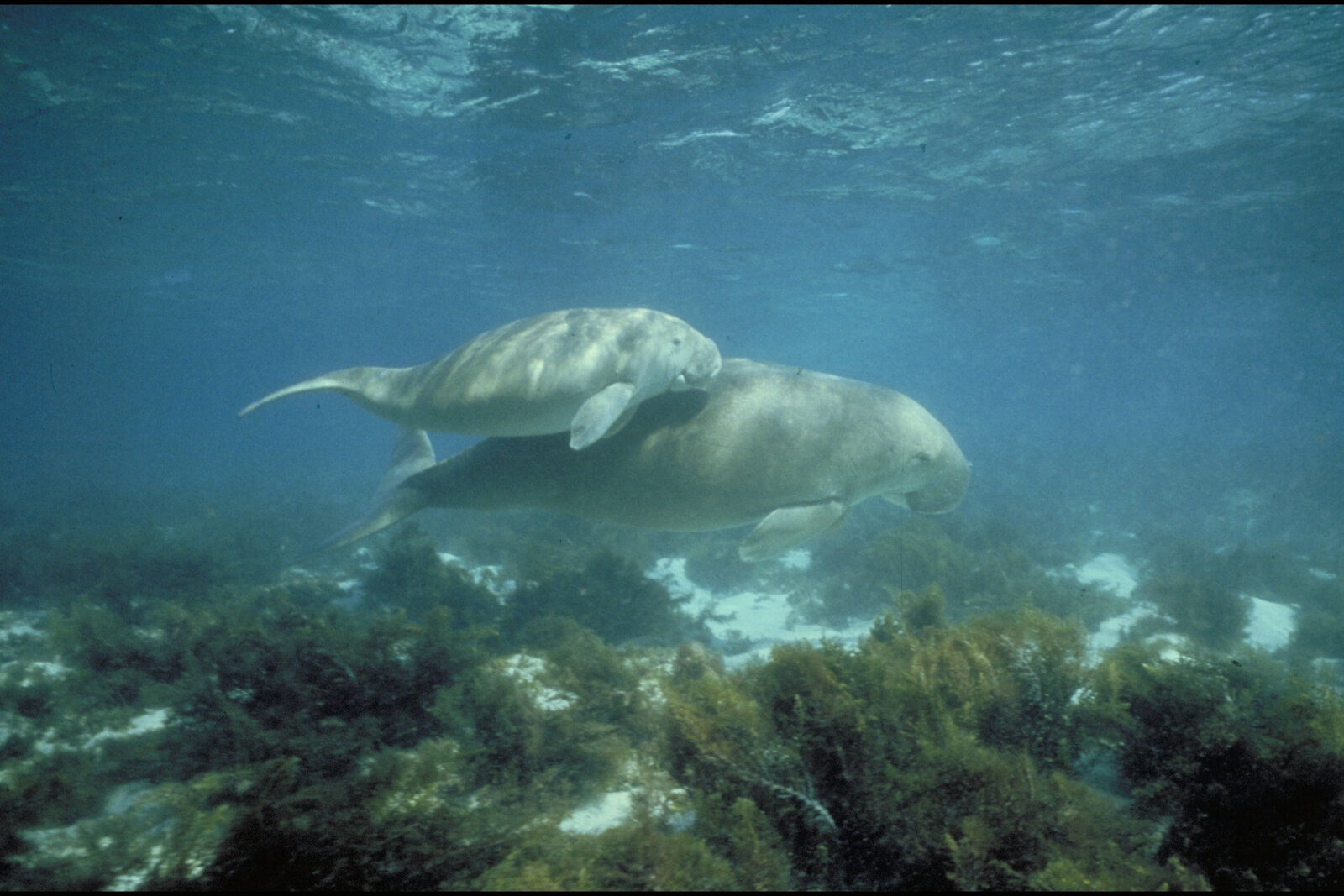
Dugongs

Sirenia is an order of fully aquatic, herbivorous mammals that inhabit rivers, estuaries, coastal marine waters, swamps, and marine wetlands. All four species are endangered.

- Family: Dugongidae
  - Genus: Dugong
    - Dugong, Dugong dugon - VU (extirpated)

== Order: Primates ==
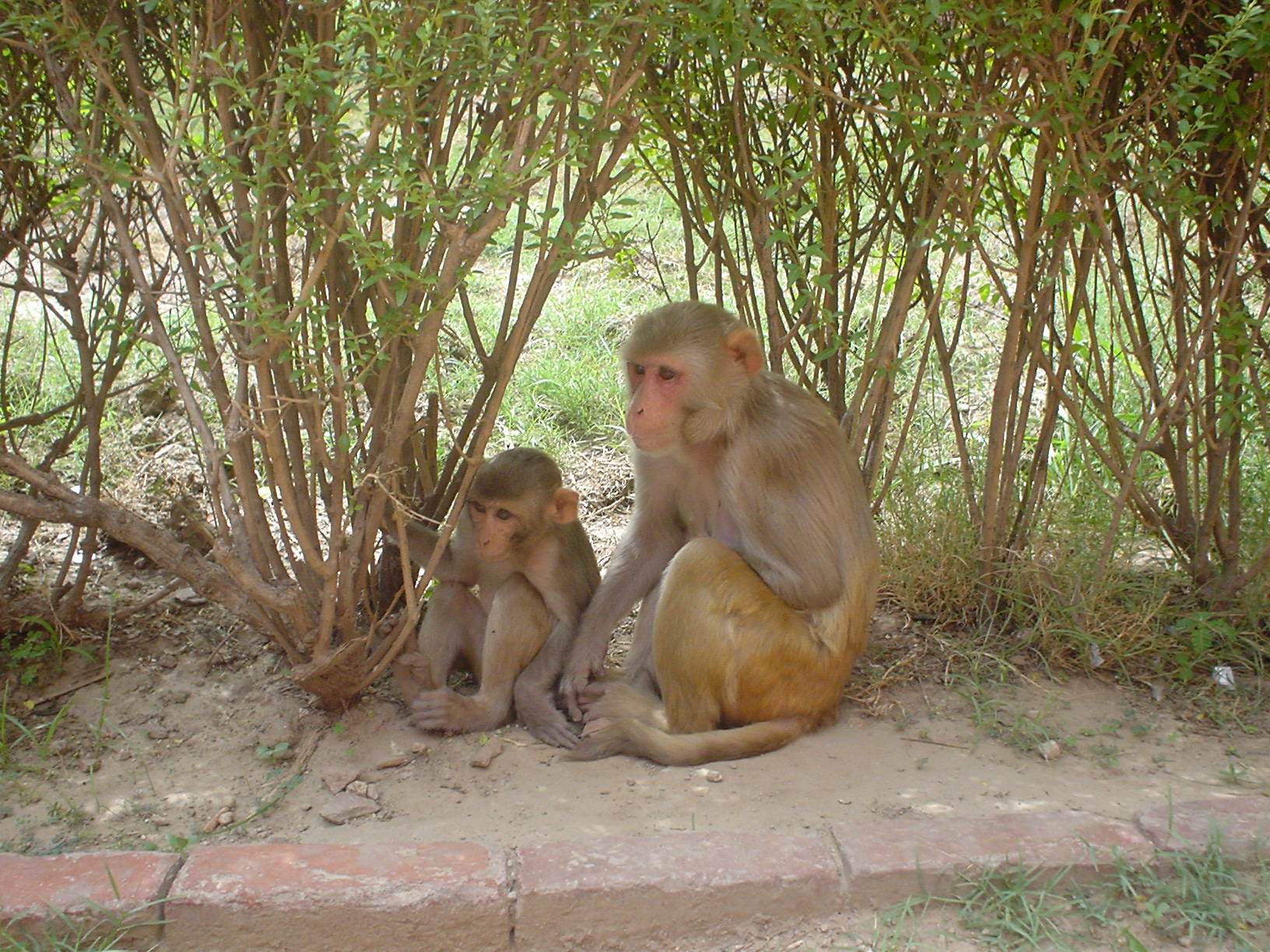
Rhesus macaque

The order Primates contains humans and their closest relatives: lemurs, lorisoids, monkeys, and apes.

- Suborder: Haplorhini
  - Infraorder: Simiiformes
    - Parvorder: Catarrhini
      - Superfamily: Cercopithecoidea
        - Family: Cercopithecidae (Old World monkeys)
          - Genus: Macaca
            - Rhesus macaque, Macaca mulatta - LC
            - Crab-eating macaque, Macaca fascicularis - EN

== Order: Rodentia (mice, squirrels, etc) ==
The order Rodentia is a large group of mammals. They have two incisors in the upper as well as in the lower jaw which grow continuously and must be kept worn down by gnawing.

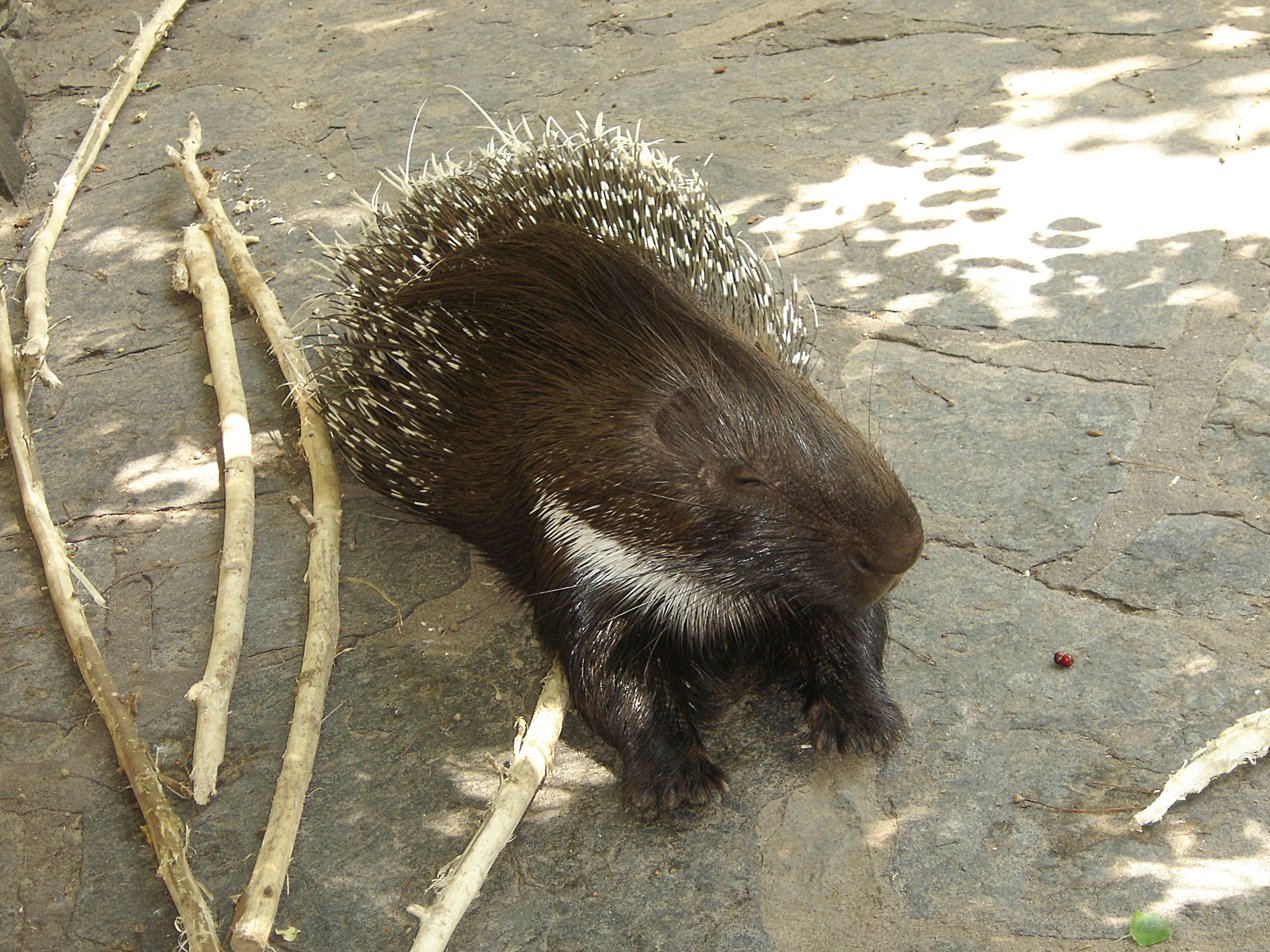
Malayan porcupine

- Muridae
  - Subfamily: Murinae
    - Genus: Bandicota
      - Greater bandicoot rat, Bandicota bengalensis - LC
      - Chestnut spiny rat, Niviventer fulvescens - LC
      - House mouse, Mus musculus - LC
      - Brown rat, Rattus norvegicus - LC
      - Ryukyu mouse, Mus caroli - LC
      - Sikkim rat, Rattus andamanensis - LC
      - Asiatic house rat, Rattus tanezumi - LC
      - Roof rat, Rattus rattus - LC
- Family: Sciuridae
  - Pallas's squirrel, Callosciurus erythraeus - LC (introduced)
  - Indian giant flying squirrel, Petaurista philippensis - LC
- Family: Hystricidae (porcupines)
  - Genus: Hystrix
    - Malayan porcupine, Hystrix brachyura - LC

== Order: Chiroptera (bats) ==
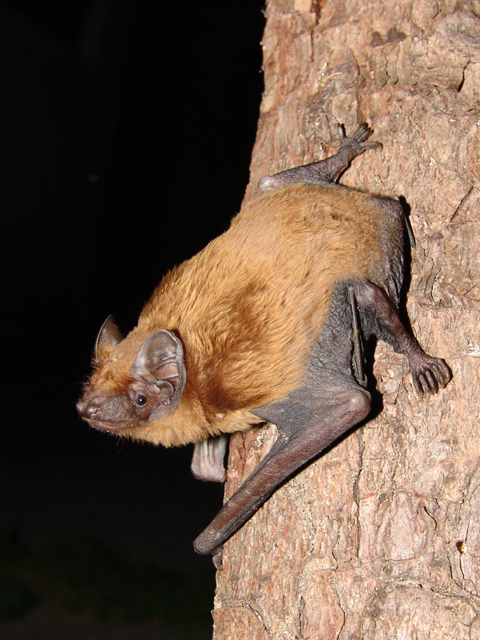
Common noctule

The bats' most distinguishing feature is that their forelimbs are developed as wings, making them the only mammals capable of flight. Bat species account for about 50% of all mammals.

- Family: Pteropodidae
  - Genus: Rousettus
    - Leschenault's rousette, Rousettus leschenaultia - NT
  - Genus: Cynopterus
    - Greater short-nosed fruit bat, Cynopterus sphinx - LC
- Family: Emballonuridae
  - Genus: Taphozous
    - Black-bearded tomb bat, Taphozous melanopogon - LC
- Family: Rhinolophidae
  - Genus: Rhinolophus
    - Rufous horseshoe bat, Rhinolophus rouxi common - LC
    - Intermediate horseshoe bat, Rhinolophus affinus common - LC
    - Least horseshoe bat, Rhinolophus pusillus common - LC
- Family: Hipposideridae
  - Genus: Hipposideros
    - Pomona roundleaf bat, Hipposideros pomona common - EN
    - Himalayan roundleaf bat, Hipposideros armiger - LC
- Family: Vespertilionidae
  - Genus: Myotis
    - Large myotis, Myotis chinensis - LC
    - Rickett's big-footed bat, Myotis ricketti - VU
    - Fringed long-footed myotis, Myotis fimbriatus - LC
    - Horsfield's bat, Myotis horsfieldii - LC (rare in the region)
    - Daubenton's bat, Myotis daubentonii - LC (rare in the region)
  - Genus: Pipistrellus
    - Japanese pipistrelle, Pipistrellus abramus - LC
    - Chinese pipistrelle, Pipistrellus pulveratus - LC
  - Genus: Nyctalus
    - Common noctule, Nyctalus noctula - LC
  - Genus: Tylonycteris
    - Lesser bamboo bat, Tylonycteris pachypus - LC (rare in the region)
    - Greater bamboo bat, Tylonycteris robustula - LC
  - Genus: Scotophilus
    - Lesser yellow bat, Scotophilus kuhlii - LC (rare in the region)
  - Genus: Miniopterus
    - Western bent-winged bat, Miniopterus magnater - LC
    - Common bent-wing bat, Miniopterus schreibersii - VU (rare in the region)
    - Small bent-winged bat, Miniopterus pusillus - LC
- Family: Molossidae
  - Genus: Chaerephon
    - Wrinkle-lipped free-tailed bat, Chaerephon plicata - LC

== Order: Pholidota (pangolins) ==
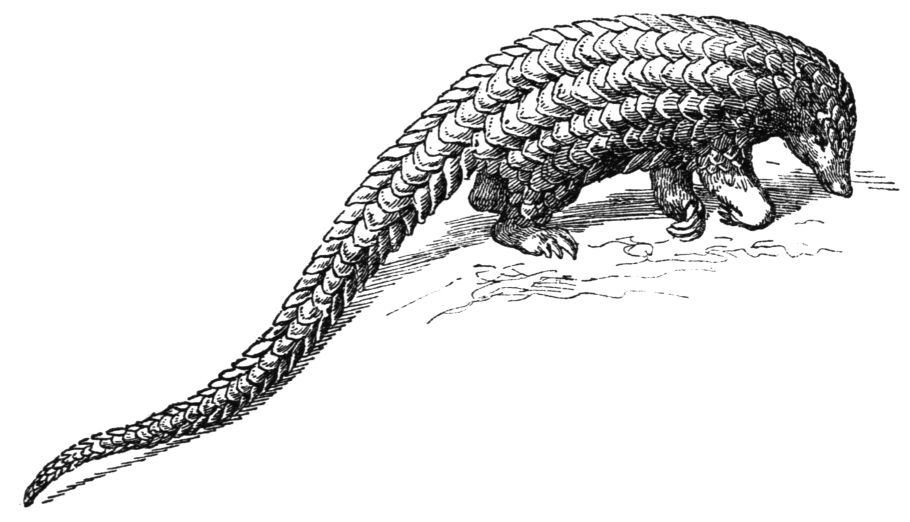
A drawing of a pangolin

The order Pholidota comprises the eight species of pangolin. Pangolins are anteaters and have the powerful claws, elongated snout and long tongue seen in the other unrelated anteater species.

- Family: Manidae
  - Genus: Manis
    - Chinese pangolin, Manis pentadactyla - CR

== Order: Cetacea (whales) ==
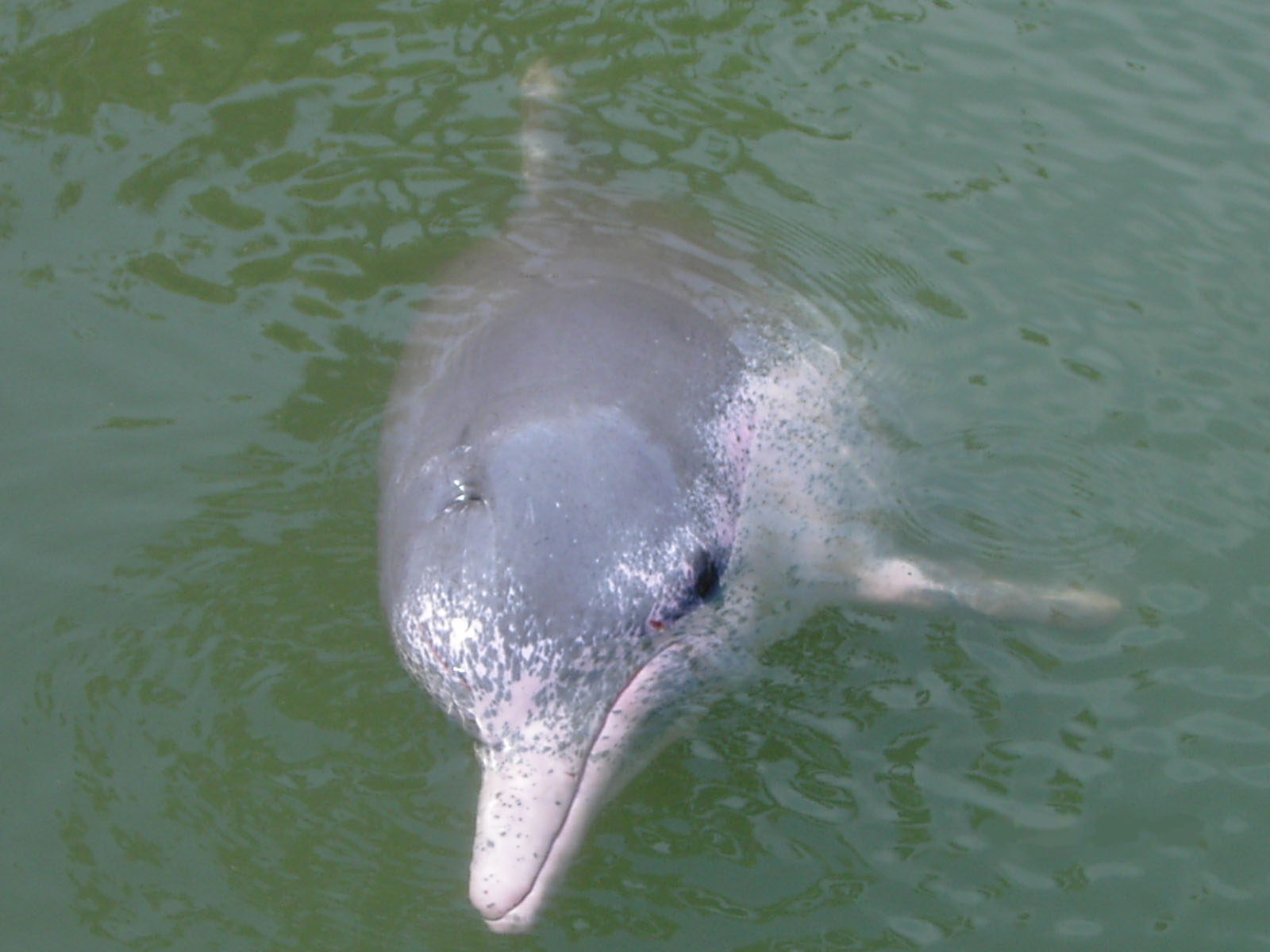
Chinese white dolphin

The order Cetacea includes whales, dolphins and porpoises. They are the mammals most fully adapted to aquatic life with a spindle-shaped nearly hairless body, protected by a thick layer of blubber, and forelimbs and tail modified to provide propulsion underwater.

- Suborder: Mysticeti
  - Family: Balaenidae
    - Genus: Eubalaena
      - North Pacific right whale, Eubalaena japonica - EN (possibly seen historically
  - Family: Balaenopteridae
    - Subfamily: Megapterinae
      - Genus: Megaptera
        - Humpback whale, Megaptera novaeangliae - LC
    - Subfamily: Balaenopterinae
      - Genus: Balaenoptera
        - Bryde's whale, Balaenoptera brydei - LC
        - Eden's whale, Balaenoptera edeni - LC
- Suborder: Odontoceti
  - Superfamily: Platanistoidea
    - Genus: Physeter
      - Family: Physeteridae
        - Sperm whale, Physeter macrocephalus - VU
    - Family: Kogiidae
      - Genus: Kogia
        - Pygmy sperm whale, Kogia breviceps LC
        - Dwarf sperm whale, Kogia sima - LC
    - Family: Delphinidae (marine dolphins)
    - Family: Phocoenidae
      - Genus: Neophocaena
        - Finless porpoise, Neophocaena phocaenoides phocaenoides - VU
        - Sunameri, Neophocaena phocaenoides sunameri - not evaluated
      - Genus: Sousa
        - Chinese white dolphin, Sousa chinensis - VU
      - Genus: Tursiops
        - Indo-Pacific bottlenose dolphin, Tursiops aduncus - NT
        - Common bottlenose dolphin, Tursiops truncatus - LC
      - Genus: Delphinus
        - Long-beaked common dolphin, Delphinus capensis - not evaluated
      - Genus: Stenella
        - Pantropical spotted dolphin, Stenella attenuata - LC
        - Spinner dolphin, Stenella longirostris - LC
        - Striped dolphin, Stenella coeruleoalba - LC
      - Genus: Steno
        - Rough-toothed dolphin, Steno bredanensis - LC
      - Genus: Lagenodelphis
        - Fraser's dolphin, Lagenodelphis hosei - LC
      - Genus: Grampus
        - Risso's dolphin, Grampus griseus - LC
      - Genus: Pseudorca
        - False killer whale, Pseudorca crassidens - NT

== Order: Artiodactyla (herbivores) ==
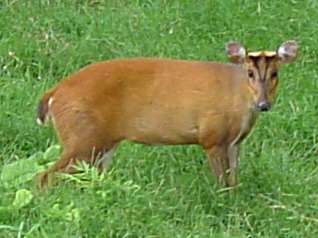
Indian muntjac

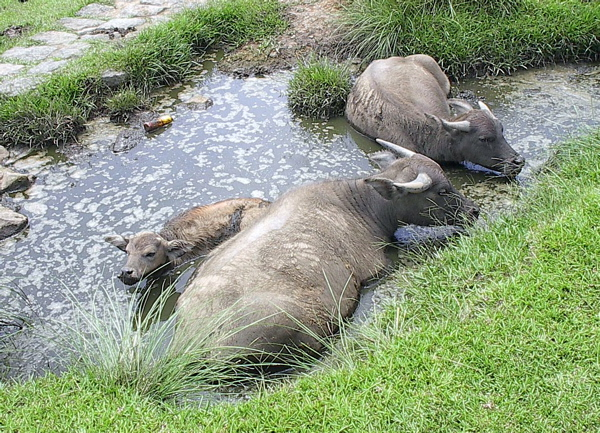
Water buffalo

The order Artiodactyla in Macau are mainly herbivore which feed only on plant material, except wild boar. There are three types of herbivores (includes native and feral) in recent Hong Kong.

- Family: Bovidae
  - Genus: Bubalus
    - Feral water buffalo, Bubalus bubalis - EN
- Family: Bovidae
  - Genus: Bos
    - Feral cattle, Bos taurus
- Family: Cervidae
  - Genus: Muntiacus
    - Indian muntjac, Muntiacus muntjak - LC
      - Reeve's muntjac, Muntiacus reevesi - LC
- Family: Suidae
  - Genus: Sus
    - Wild boar, Sus scrofa - LC

== Order: Carnivora (carnivorans) ==
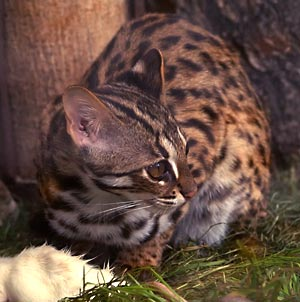
Leopard cat

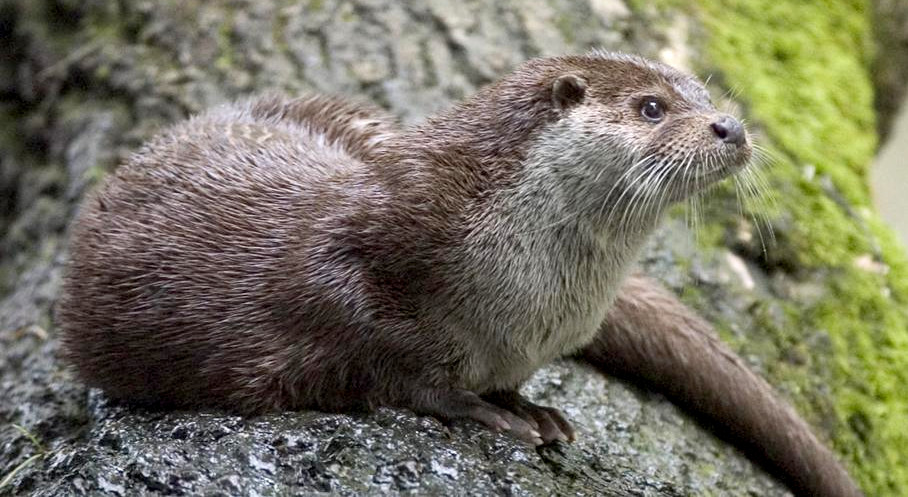
European otter

There are over 260 species of carnivorans, the majority of which eat meat as their primary dietary item. They have a characteristic skull shape and dentition.

- Suborder: Feliformia
  - Family: Felidae (cats)
    - Subfamily: Felinae
      - Genus: Prionailurus
        - Leopard cat, Prionailurus bengalensis - LC
        - Feral cat, Felis catus
    - Subfamily: Pantherinae
      - Genus: Panthera
        - Leopard, Panthera pardus - VU
  - Family: Canidae (dogs, wolves, etc.)
    - Subfamily: Caninae
      - Genus: Vulpes
        - Red fox, Vulpes vulpes - LC
      - Genus: Cuon
        - Dhole, Cuon alpinus - EN
      - Genus: Canis
        - Feral dog, Canis familiaris
  - Family: Viverridae (civets, etc.)
    - Subfamily: Viverrinae
      - Genus: Viverricula
        - Small Indian civet, Viverricula indica - LC
        - Large Indian civet, Viverra zibetha - LC
        - Masked palm civet, Paguma larvata taivana - LC
  - Family: Herpestidae (mongoose)
    - Subfamily: Herpestinae
      - Genus: Urva
        - Javan mongoose, Urva javanica - LC
        - Crab-eating mongoose, Urva urva - LC
- Suborder: Caniformia
  - Family: Mustelidae (mustelids)
    - Genus: Mustela
      - Yellow-bellied weasel, Mustela kathiah - LC
    - Genus: Martes
      - Yellow-throated marten, Martes flavigula - LC
    - Genus: Lutra
      - European otter, Lutra lutra - NT
    - Genus: Melogale
      - Chinese ferret badger, Melogale moschata - LC

== See also ==
- Wildlife of China
- List of chordate orders
- Lists of mammals by region
- List of prehistoric mammals
- Mammal classification
- List of mammals described in the 2000s
