= List of mammals of Hong Kong =

This is a list of the mammal species recorded in Hong Kong. There are 68 mammal species in Hong Kong.

The following tags are used to highlight each species' conservation status as assessed by the International Union for Conservation of Nature:

EX	Extinct	No reasonable doubt that the last individual has died.
EW	Extinct in the wild	Known only to survive in captivity or as in naturalised populations well outside its previous range.
CR	Critically endangered	The species is in imminent risk of extinction in the wild.
EN	Endangered	The species is facing an extremely high risk of extinction in the wild.
VU	Vulnerable	The species is facing a high risk of extinction in the wild.
NT	Near threatened	The species does not meet any of the criteria that would categorise it as risking extinction but it is likely to do so in the future.
LC	Least concern	There are no current identifiable risks to the species.
DD	Data deficient	There is inadequate information to make an assessment of the risks to this species.

Some species were assessed using an earlier set of criteria. Species assessed using this system have the following instead of near threatened and least concern categories:

LR/cd	Lower risk/conservation dependent	Species which were the focus of conservation programmes and may have moved into a higher risk category if that programme was discontinued.
LR/nt	Lower risk/near threatened	Species which are close to being classified as vulnerable but are not the subject of conservation programmes.
LR/lc	Lower risk/least concern	Species for which there are no identifiable risks.

== Order: Primates ==
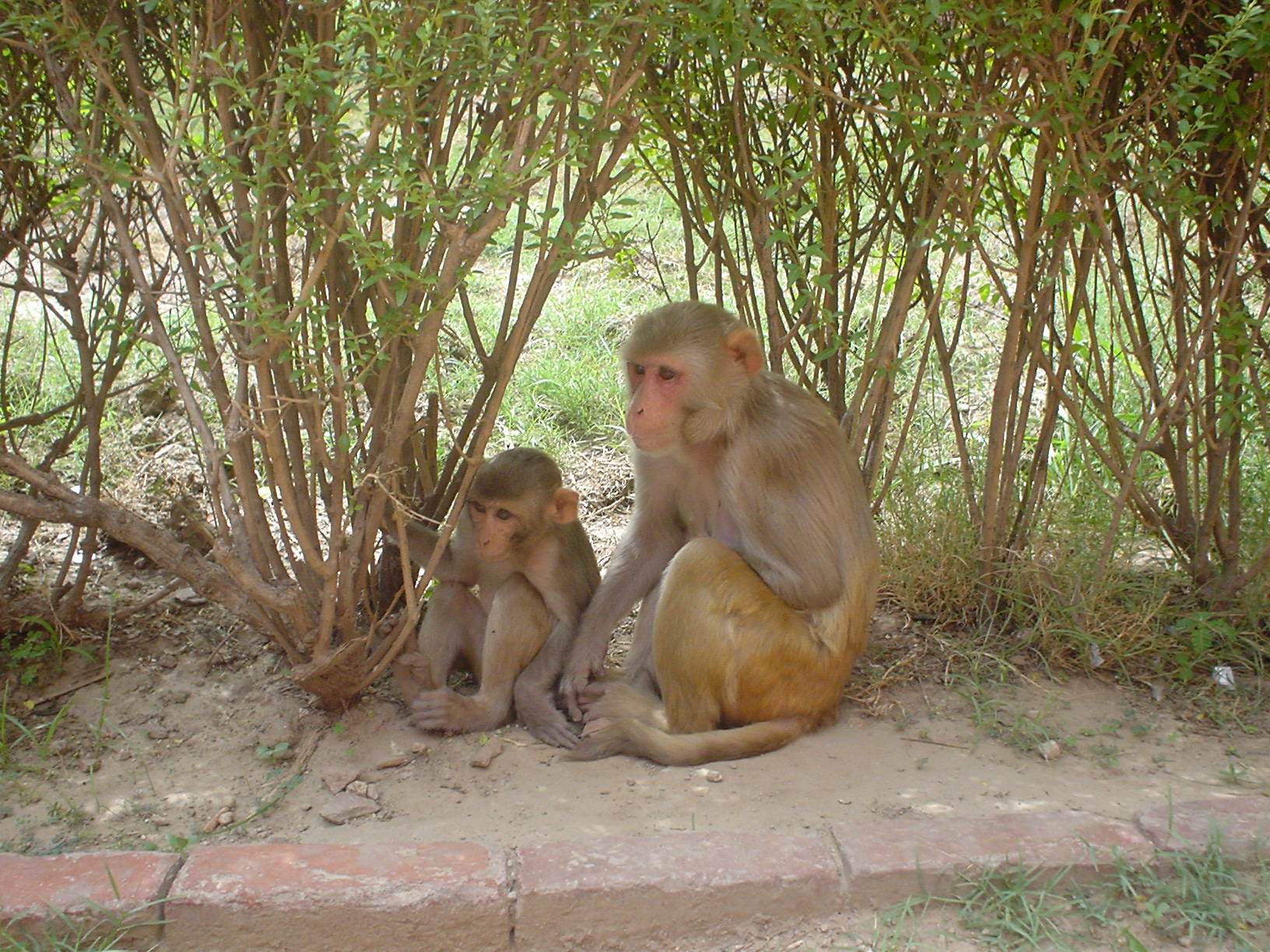
Rhesus macaque

The order Primates contains humans and their closest relatives: lemurs, lorisoids, monkeys, and apes.

- Suborder: Haplorhini
  - Infraorder: Simiiformes
    - Parvorder: Catarrhini
      - Superfamily: Cercopithecoidea
        - Family: Cercopithecidae (Old World monkeys)
          - Genus: Macaca
            - Rhesus macaque, Macaca mulatta LC reintroduced
            - Crab-eating macaque, Macaca fascicularis VU introduced

== Order: Rodentia (mice, squirrel, etc) ==
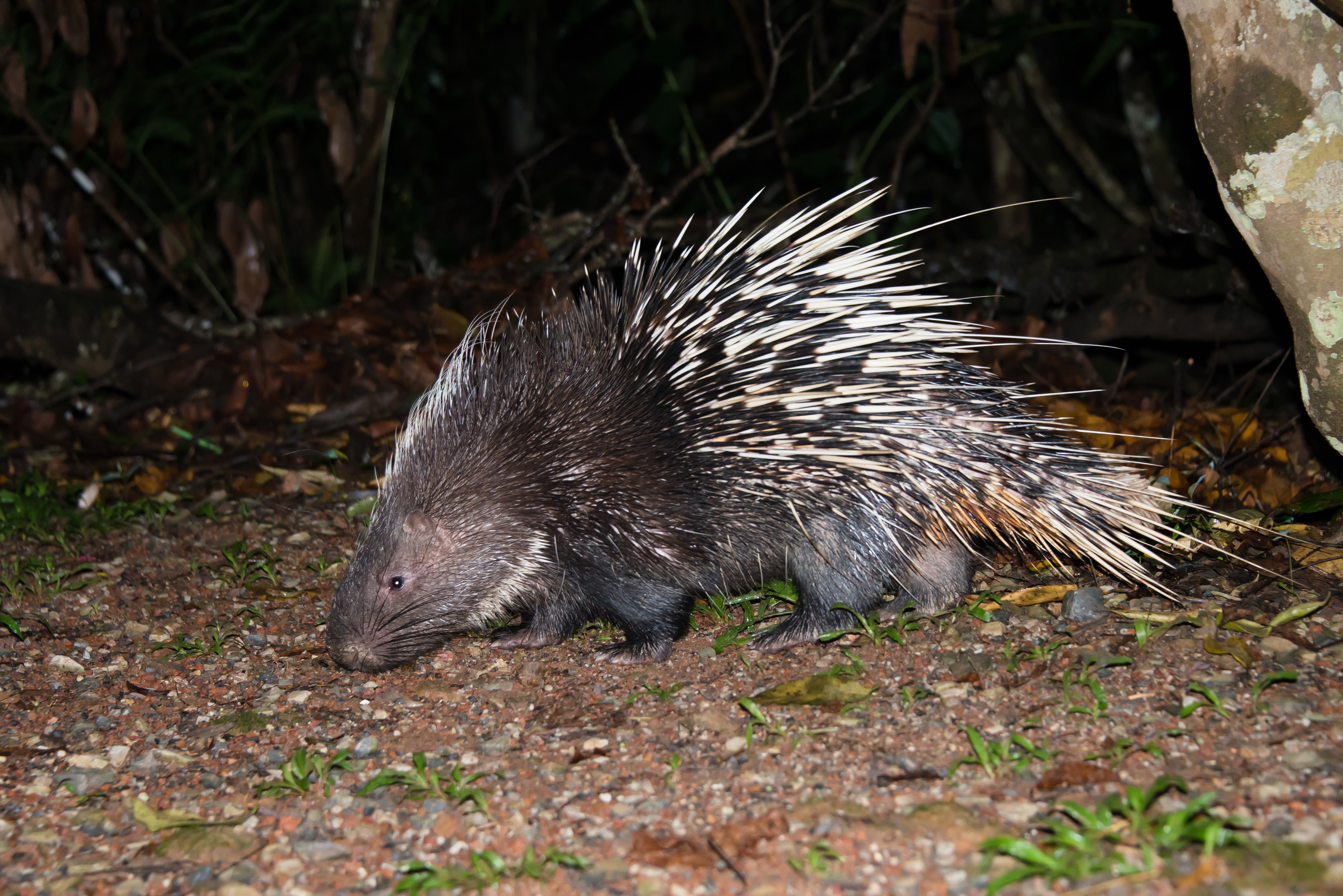
Malayan porcupine

The order Rodentia is a large group of mammals. They have two incisors in the upper as well as in the lower jaw which grow continuously and must be kept worn down by gnawing.

- Muridae
  - Subfamily: Murinae
    - Genus: Bandicota
      - Greater bandicoot rat, Bandicota bengalensis LC
      - Chestnut spiny rat, Niviventer fulvescens LC
      - House mouse, Mus musculus LC introduced
      - Brown rat, Rattus norvegicus LC introduced
      - Ryukyu mouse, Mus caroli LC
      - Sikkim rat, Rattus andamanensis LC
      - Asiatic house rat, Rattus tanezumi LC
      - Roof rat, Rattus rattus LC introduced
- Family:Sciuridae
  - Pallas's squirrel, Callosciurus erythraeus LC introduced
- Family: Hystricidae (porcupine)
  - Genus: Hystrix
    - Malayan porcupine, Hystrix brachyuraLC

== Order: Chiroptera (bats) ==
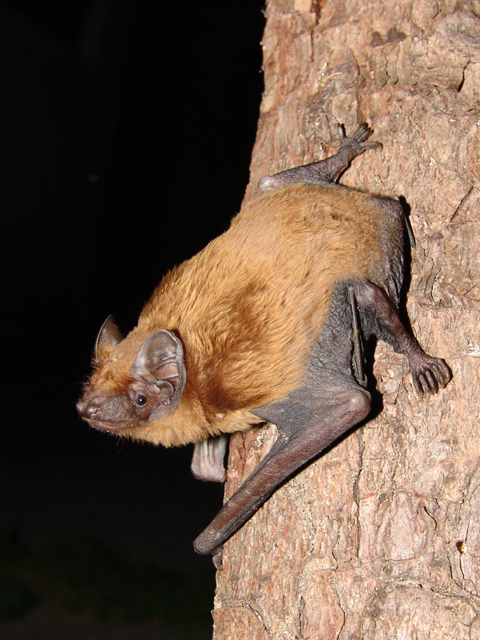
Common noctule

The bats' most distinguishing feature is that their forelimbs are developed as wings, making them the only mammals capable of flight. Bat species account for about 50% of all mammals.

- Family: Pteropodidae
  - Genus: Rousettus
    - Leschenault's rousette, Rousettus leschenaultia LC
  - Genus: Cynopterus
    - Greater short-nosed fruit bat, Cynopterus sphinx LC (common)
- Family: Emballonuridae
  - Genus: Taphozous
    - Black-bearded tomb bat, Taphozous melanopogon LC
- Family: Rhinolophidae
  - Genus: Rhinolophus
    - Rufous horseshoe bat, Rhinolophus rouxi LC (common)
    - Intermediate horseshoe bat, Rhinolophus affinus LC (common)
    - Least horseshoe bat, Rhinolophus pusillus LC (common)
- Family: Hipposideridae
  - Genus: Hipposideros
    - Pomona roundleaf bat, Hipposideros pomona EN (common)
    - Himalayan roundleaf bat, Hipposideros armigerLC
- Family: Vespertilionidae
  - Genus: Myotis
    - Large myotis, Myotis chinensis LC
    - Rickett's big-footed bat, Myotis ricketti NT
    - Myotis fimbriatusLC
    - Horsfield's bat, Myotis horsfieldii LC (rare in the region)
    - Daubenton's bat, Myotis daubentonii LC rare)
  - Genus: Pipistrellus
    - Japanese pipistrelle, Pipistrellus abramus LC (abundant)
    - Chinese pipistrelle, Pipistrellus pulveratus LC (rare)
  - Genus: Nyctalus
    - Common noctule, Nyctalus noctula LC
  - Genus: Tylonycteris
    - Lesser bamboo bat, Tylonycteris pachypus LC (rare in the region)
    - Greater bamboo bat, Tylonycteris robustula LC
  - Genus: Scotophilus
    - Lesser yellow bat, Scotophilus kuhlii LC (rare)
  - Genus: Miniopterus
    - Western bent-winged bat, Miniopterus magnater LC (common)
    - Common bent-wing bat, Miniopterus schreibersii VU (rare)
    - Small bent-winged bat, Miniopterus pusillus LC
- Family:Molossidae
  - Genus: Chaerephon
    - Wrinkle-lipped free-tailed bat, Chaerephon plicata LC

== Order: Pholidota (pangolins) ==
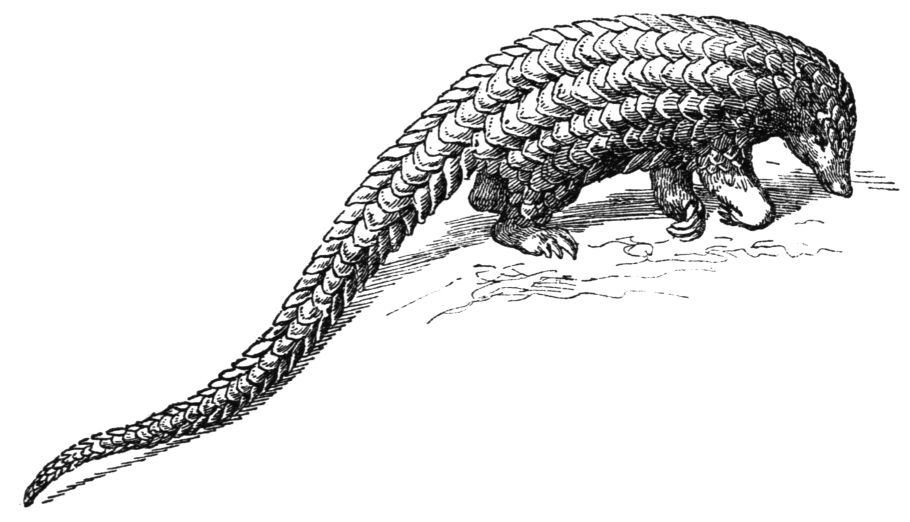
A drawing of a pangolin

The order Pholidota comprises the eight species of pangolin. Pangolins are anteaters and have the powerful claws, elongated snout and long tongue seen in the other unrelated anteater species.

- Family: Manidae
  - Genus: Manis
    - Chinese pangolin, Manis pentadactyla CR

== Order: Cetacea (whales) ==
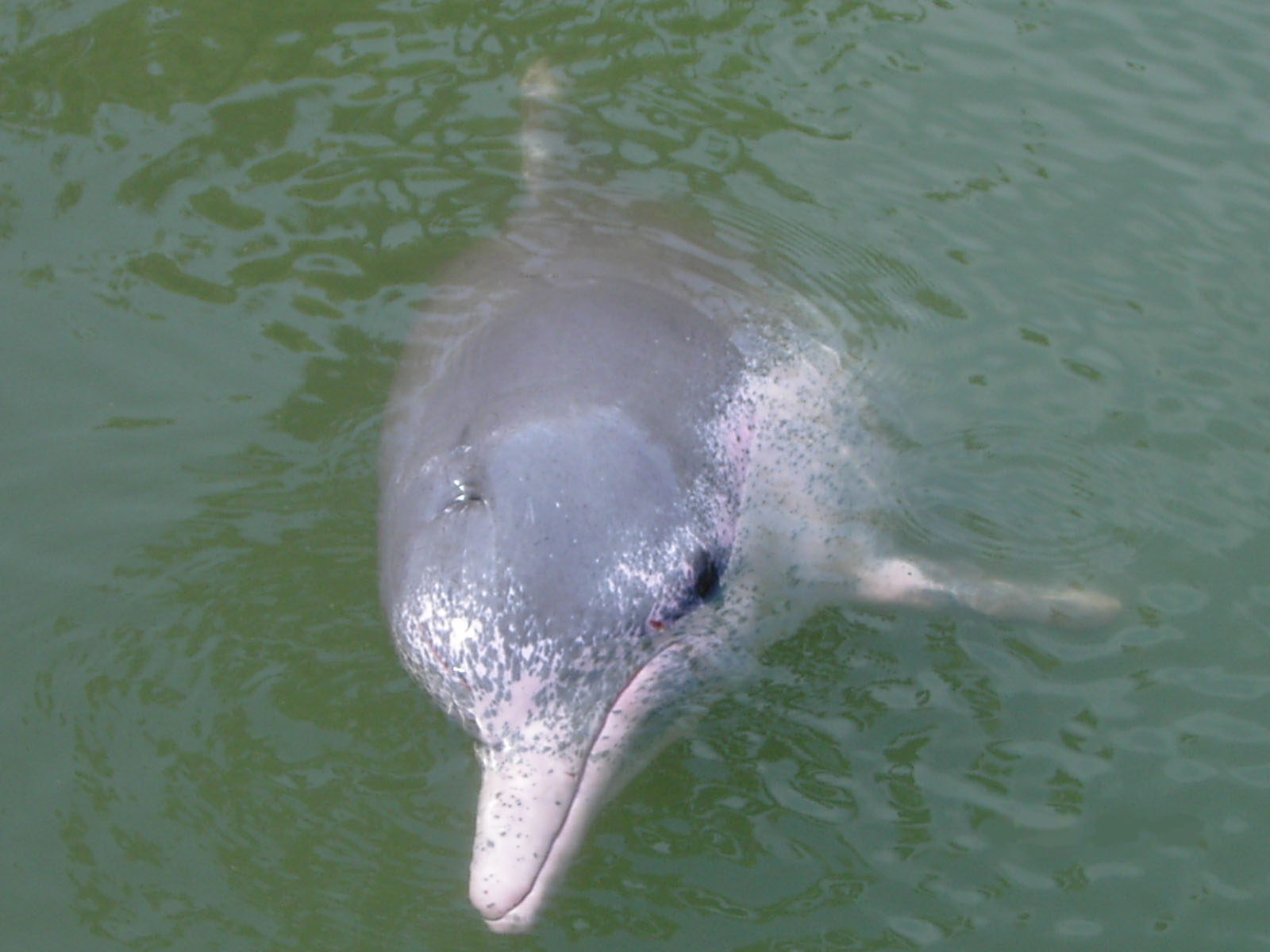
Chinese white dolphin

The order Cetacea includes whales, dolphins and porpoises. They are the mammals most fully adapted to aquatic life with a spindle-shaped nearly hairless body, protected by a thick layer of blubber, and forelimbs and tail modified to provide propulsion underwater.

- Suborder: Mysticeti
  - Family: Balaenidae
    - Genus: Eubalaena
      - North Pacific right whale, Eubalaena japonica EN
  - Family: Balaenopteridae
    - Subfamily: Megapterinae
      - Genus: Megaptera
        - Humpback whale, Megaptera novaeangliae LC (very rare today)
    - Subfamily: Balaenopterinae
      - Genus: Balaenoptera
        - Common minke whale, Balaenoptera acutorostrata LC (unconfirmed)
        - Omura's whale, Balaenoptera brydei DD (possible)
        - Bryde's whale, Balaenoptera brydei DD
        - Fin whale, Balaenoptera physalus EN (unconfirmed)
- Suborder: Odontoceti
  - Superfamily: Platanistoidea
    - Genus: Physeter
      - Family: Physeteridae
        - Sperm whale, Physeter macrocephalus VU
    - Family: Kogiidae
      - Genus: Kogia
        - Pygmy sperm whale, Kogia breviceps DD
    - Family: Delphinidae (marine dolphins)
    - Family: Phocoenidae
      - Genus: Neophocaena
        - Indo-Pacific finless porpoise, Neophocaena phocaenoides VU
      - Genus: Sousa
        - Chinese white dolphin, Sousa chinensis NT (Locally CR)
      - Genus: Tursiops
        - Indo-Pacific bottlenose dolphin, Tursiops aduncus DD
        - Common bottlenose dolphin, Tursiops truncatus DD
      - Genus: Delphinus
        - Long-beaked common dolphin, Delphinus capensis DD
      - Genus: Stenella
        - Pantropical spotted dolphin, Stenella attenuata LC
        - Spinner dolphin, Stenella longirostris DD
        - Striped dolphin, Stenella coeruleoalba LC
      - Genus: Steno
        - Rough-toothed dolphin, Steno bredanensis LC
      - Genus: Lagenodelphis
        - Fraser's dolphin, Lagenodelphis hosei DD
      - Genus: Grampus
        - Risso's dolphin, Grampus griseus LC
      - Genus: Pseudorca
        - False killer whale, Pseudorca crassidens NT

== Order: Artiodactyla (even-toed ungulates) ==
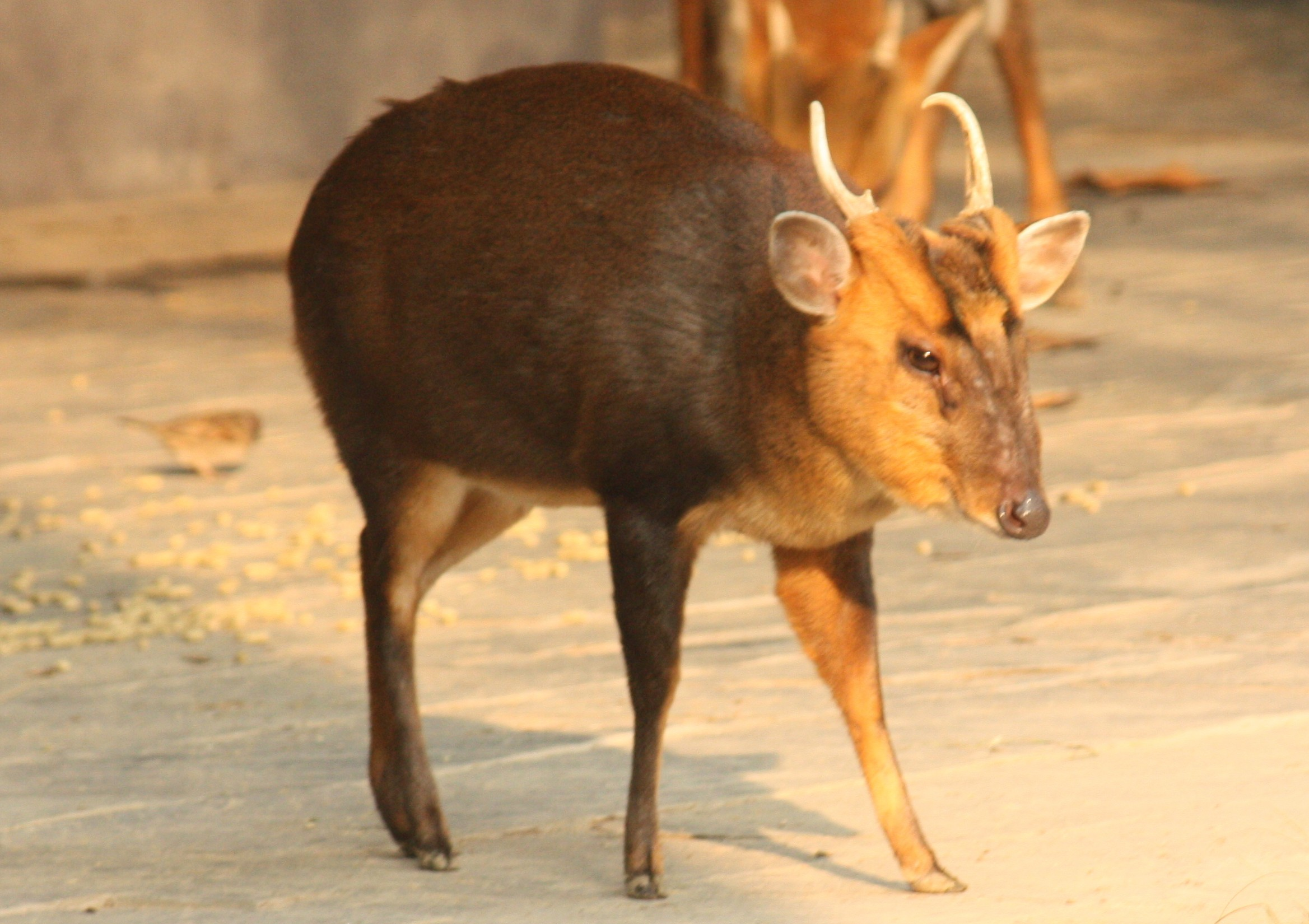
Reeves's muntjac

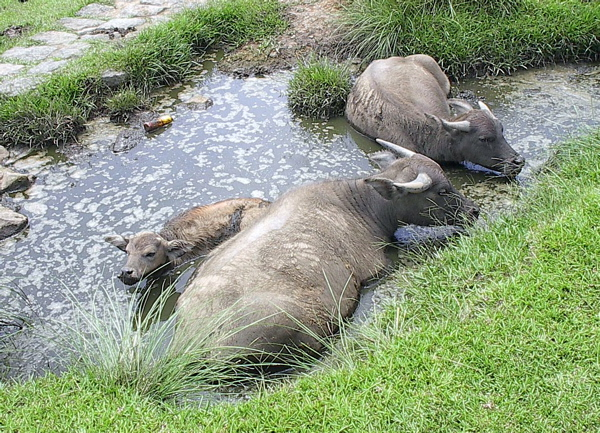
Water buffalo

The order Artiodactyla in Hong Kong are mainly herbivore which feed only on plant material, except wild boar.

- Family: Bovidae
  - Genus: Bubalus
    - Water buffalo, Bubalus bubalis introduced
- Family: Bovidae
  - Genus: Bos
    - Zebu, Bos indicus introduced
- Family: Cervidae
  - Genus: Muntiacus
    - Reeves's muntjac, Muntiacus reevesi LC
- Family: Suidae
  - Genus: Sus
    - Wild boar, Sus scrofa LC

== Order: Carnivora (carnivorans) ==
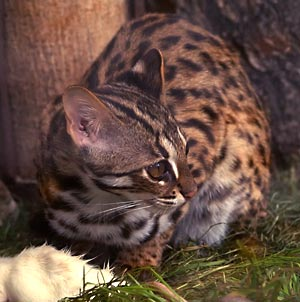
Leopard cat

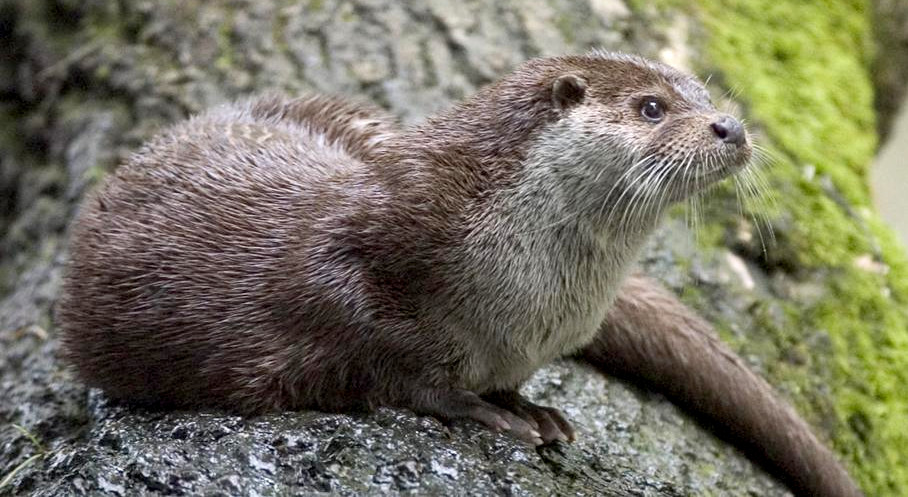
European otter

There are over 260 species of carnivorans, the majority of which eat meat as their primary dietary item. They have a characteristic skull shape and dentition.

- Suborder: Feliformia
  - Family: Felidae (cats)
    - Subfamily: Felinae
      - Genus: Prionailurus
        - Leopard cat, Prionailurus bengalensis LC
      - Genus: Felis
        - Domestic cat, Felis catus introduced
    - Subfamily: Pantherinae
      - Genus: Panthera
        - Tiger, Panthera tigris EN extirpated
        - Clouded leopard, Neofelis nebulosaVU extirpated
        - Leopard, Panthera pardus VU extirpated
  - Family: Viverridae (civets, etc.)
    - Subfamily: Viverrinae
      - Genus: Viverricula
        - Large Indian civet, Viverra zibetha LC extirpated
        - Small Indian civet, Viverricula indica LC
        - Masked palm civet, Paguma larvata LC
  - Family:Herpestidae (mongoose)
    - Subfamily:Herpestinae
      - Genus: Urva
        - Javan mongoose, Urva javanica LC
        - Crab-eating mongoose, Urva urva LC
- Suborder: Caniformia
  - Family: Canidae (dog, wolf etc.)
    - Subfamily: Caninae
      - Genus: Cuon
        - Dhole, Cuon alpinus EN extirpated
      - Genus: Vulpes
        - Red fox, Vulpes vulpes LC extirpated
      - Genus: Canis
        - Domestic dog, Canis familiaris introduced
  - Family: Mustelidae (mustelids)
    - Genus: Mustela
      - Yellow-bellied weasel, Mustela kathiah LC
    - Genus: Lutra
      - European otter, Lutra lutra NT
    - Genus: Melogale
      - Chinese ferret badger, Melogale moschata LC

== See also ==
- Wildlife of China
- List of chordate orders
- List of mammals of China
- Lists of mammals by region
- List of prehistoric mammals
- Mammal classification
- List of mammals described in the 2000s
