= C. plicata =

C. plicata may refer to:

- Caenorhabditis plicata, a species of nematodes found in Germany
- Chaerephon plicata, the wrinkle-lipped free-tailed bat, a bat species found in Asia
