= Savile's bandicoot rat =

Conservation status
- Least Concern (IUCN 3.1)

Scientific classification
- Kingdom: Animalia
- Phylum: Chordata
- Class: Mammalia
- Infraclass: Placentalia
- Order: Rodentia
- Family: Muridae
- Genus: Bandicota
- Species: B. savilei

Binomial name
- Bandicota savilei Thomas, 1916
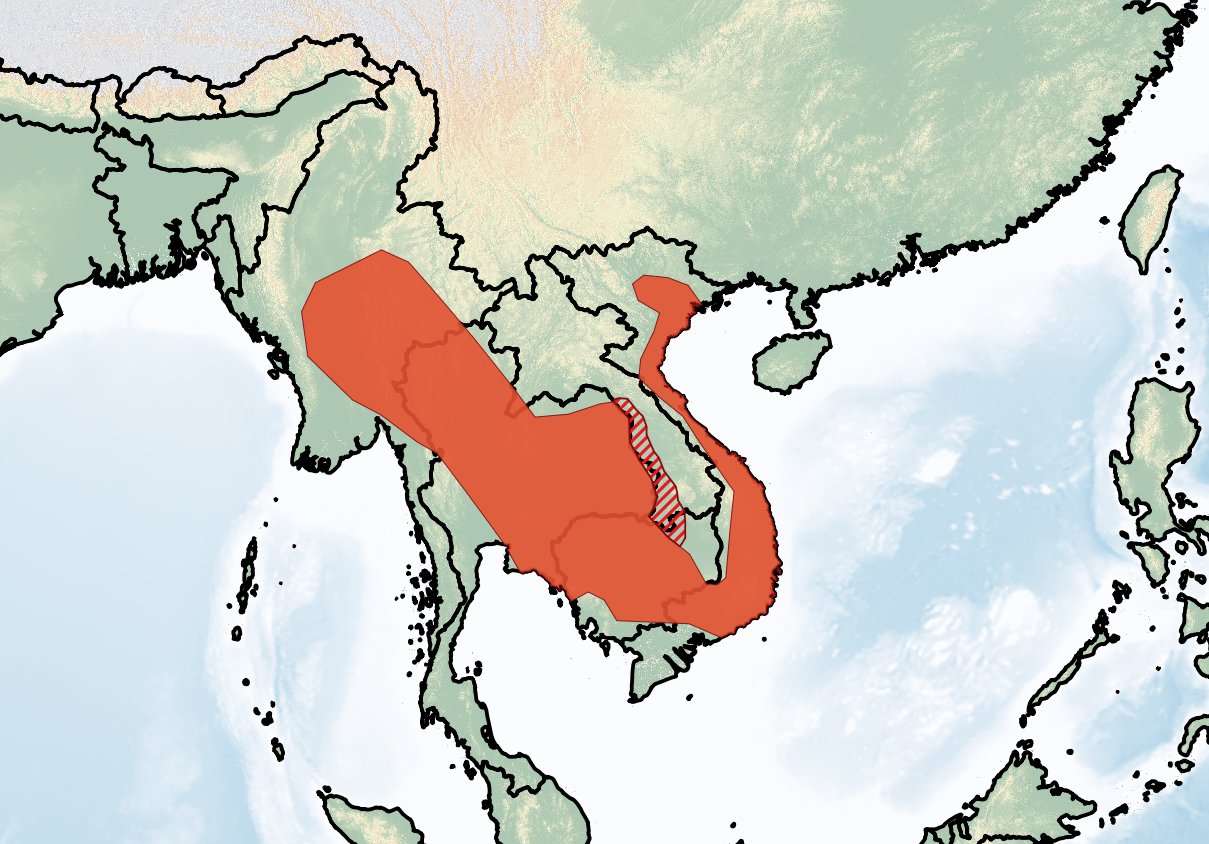

Species of rodent

Savile's bandicoot rat (Bandicota savilei) is a species of rodent in the family Muridae found in Myanmar, Thailand, and Vietnam. This species inhabits dry agricultural lands, where they feed on crops such as corn.

== Parasites ==
- Leptospira spp.
- Orientia tsutsugamushi
- Bartonella spp.
- Hantaviruses
