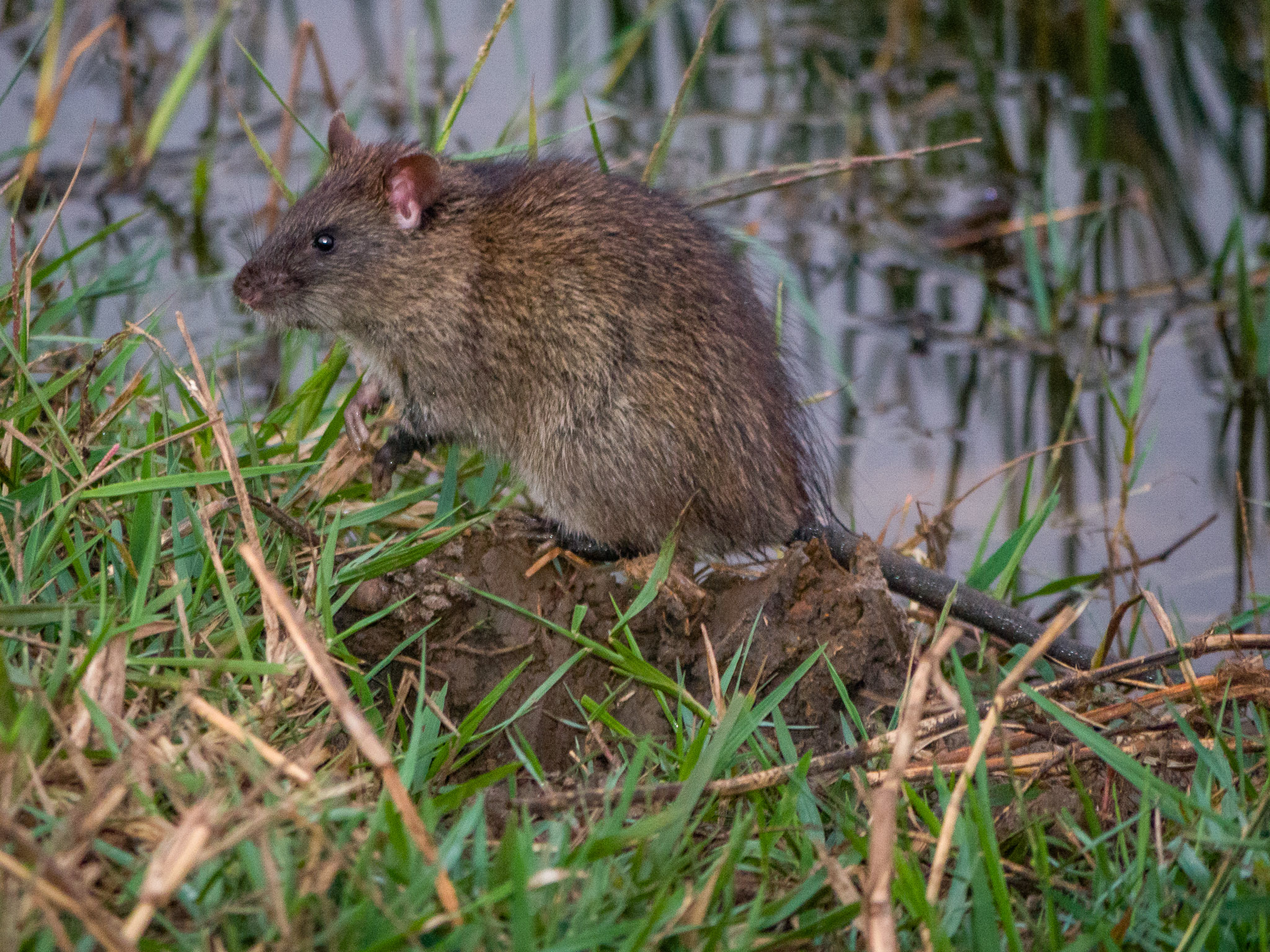

Conservation status
- Least Concern (IUCN 3.1)

Scientific classification
- Kingdom: Animalia
- Phylum: Chordata
- Class: Mammalia
- Order: Rodentia
- Family: Muridae
- Genus: Bandicota
- Species: B. bengalensis

Binomial name
- Bandicota bengalensis Gray, 1835
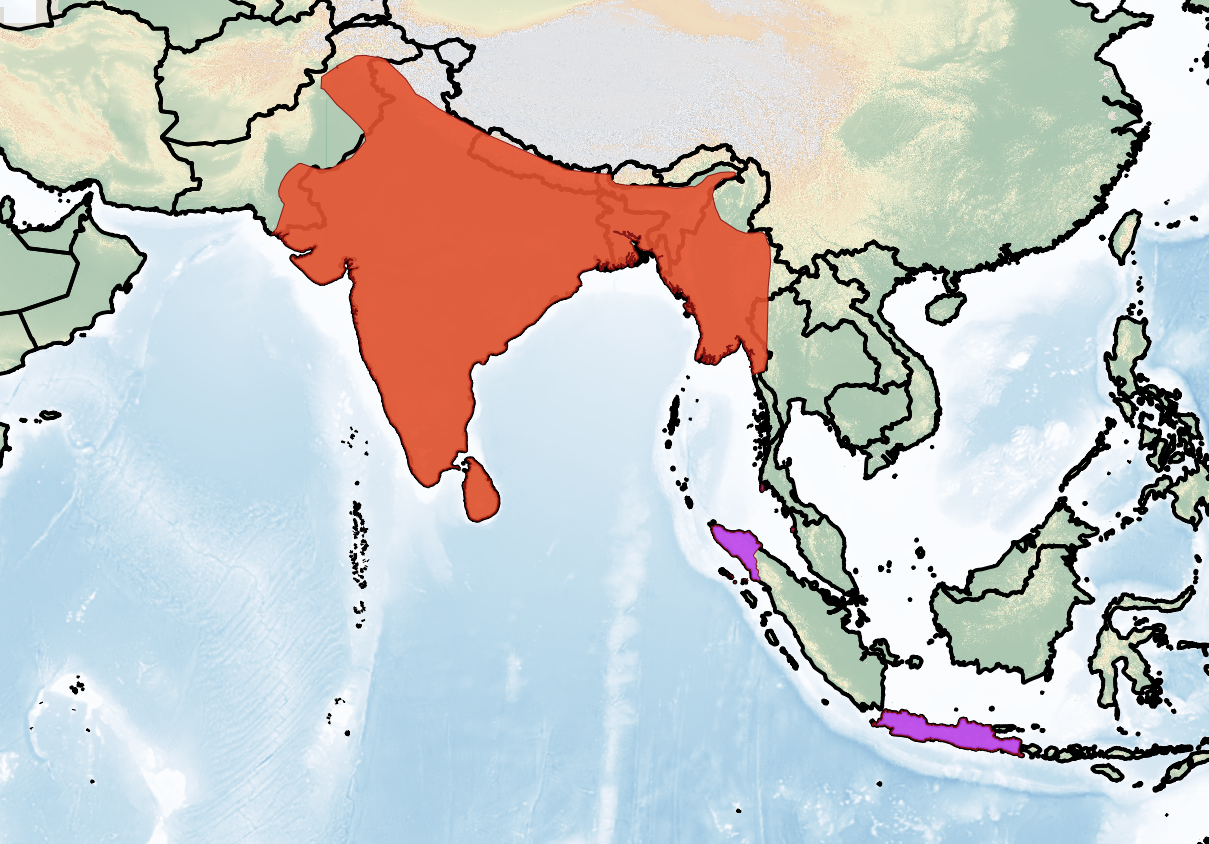

= Lesser bandicoot rat =

Species of rats

The lesser bandicoot rat, Sindhi rice rat, Bengal rat or Indian mole-rat (Bandicota bengalensis) is a giant rat of Southern Asia, not related to the true bandicoots which are marsupials. They can be up to 40 cm (16 in) long (including the tail), are considered a pest in the cereal crops and gardens of Bangladesh, India and Sri Lanka, and emit piglike grunts when attacking. The name bandicoot is derived from the Telugu language word pandikokku, which translates loosely to "pig-rat". Like the better known rats in the genus Rattus, bandicoot rats are members of the family Muridae. Their fur is dark or (rarely) pale brown dorsally, occasionally blackish, and light to dark grey ventrally. The head-body length is around 250 mm, and the uniformly dark tail is shorter than the head-body length.

== Distribution and habitat ==
These rats are also known to inhabit houses in villages and are particularly aggressive when threatened. The controls are done by mechanical (mouse trap etc.), rodenticides and biological control (by introducing rodent diseases etc.)

== Behaviour and ecology ==
Commonly, it lives in cultivated plains and gardens and is one of the most destructive pests to crops and cultivation. It digs burrows with characteristic pile of earth around the entrance, hence its name. The burrow system is extensive and elaborate, consisting of numerous chambers (sleeping, storing, etc.), galleries and exits or 'bolt-holes', which are covered with loose earth, facilitating an easy escape during emergencies. The storage chambers are stocked with large amounts of grain, specially during harvest time. Usually, one mole-rat is found in one burrow, except when a mother is with young. It has a habit of erecting its long guard hairs scattered over the back and emitting harsh grunts when disturbed.

=== Reproduction ===
The lesser bandicoot and two other species are nocturnal or most active at twilight. They construct burrows to nest and bear their litters. The number of bandicoot babies can range from two to 18. Their staple diet is grains, fruit, and invertebrates. They are prone to destroying cultivated crops in fields. Of all the three species, the lesser bandicoot is an especially aggressive burrower and has been reported to make tunnels in concrete cellars. Female can have up to 10 litters. Young (10-12 per litter) are born blind. Young reach sexual maturity around 60 days after birth. Lifespan of adults is about 8–9 months.

== As a vector ==
It is a carrier of and spreads many diseases such as

- Plague
- Murine typhus
- Leptospirosis
- Salmonellosis
- Rat bite fever

== Susceptibility to drugs ==
Warfarin is a first-generation anticoagulant that relies on multiple feeding events to achieve lethality in susceptible rodents. The majority of lesser bandicoot rats are highly susceptible to warfarin, where according to one experiment, one female animal has survived a high dose of active ingredient (79.1 mg kg-1).

Triptolide has been reported to cause sterility in male rats and mice. Triptolide treatment affected the histomorphology of the uterus of these rats by causing a decrease in lumen and columnar cell height and number of uterine glands and ovary by increasing the number of atretic follicles and decreasing the number of developing follicles.

Lesser bandicoot rats appear to be averse to scilliroside at all concentrations in food baits. Maximum mortality attained on free-choice feeding on scilliroside is 90% among the individuals.
