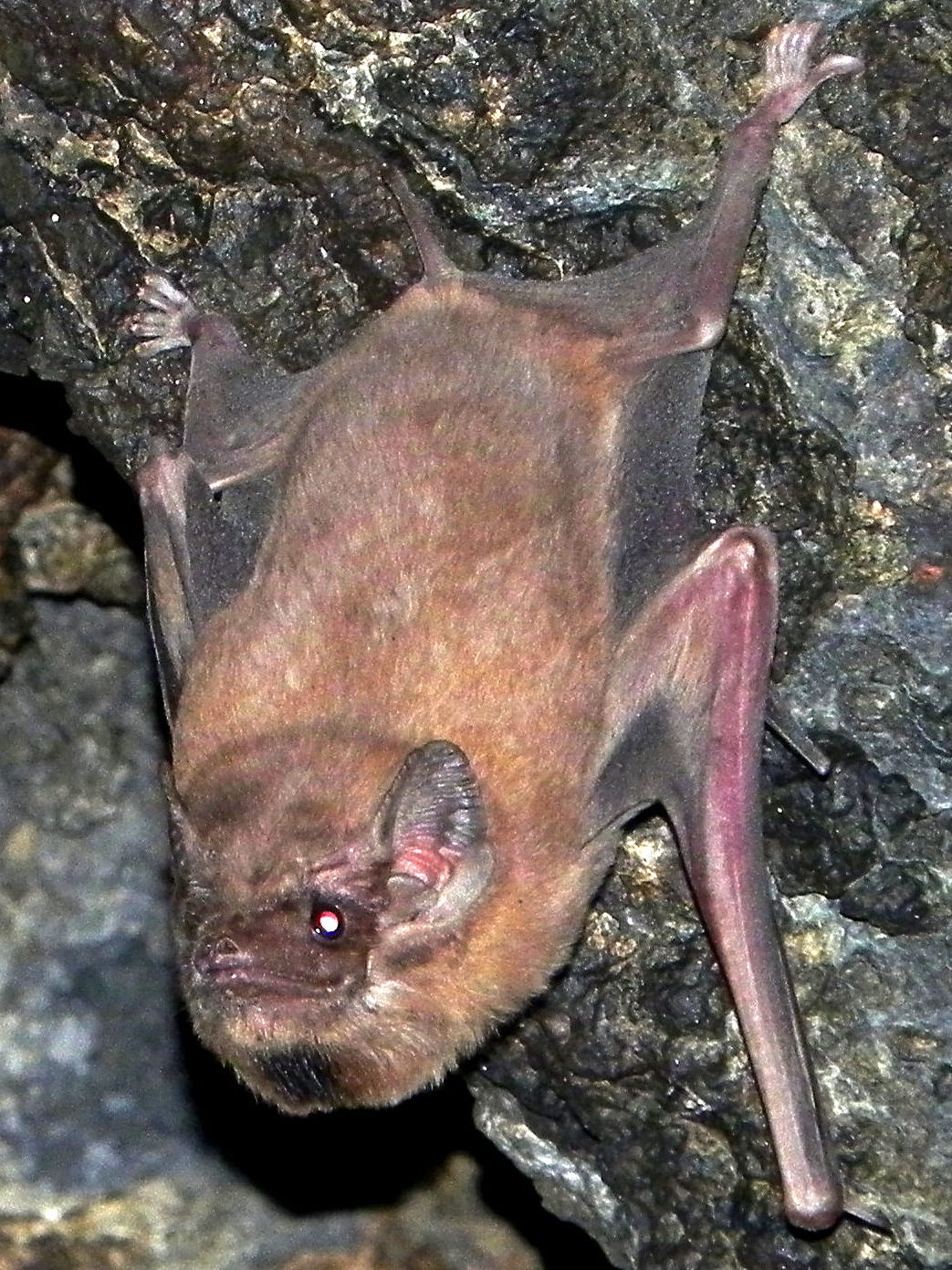
- male with prominent black beard

Conservation status
- Least Concern (IUCN 3.1)

Scientific classification
- Kingdom: Animalia
- Phylum: Chordata
- Class: Mammalia
- Order: Chiroptera
- Family: Emballonuridae
- Genus: Taphozous
- Species: T. melanopogon

Binomial name
- Taphozous melanopogon Temminck, 1841
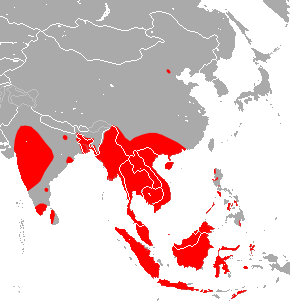
- Black-bearded Tomb Bat range

Synonyms
- Taphozous bicolor Temminck, 1841; Taphozous phillipenensis Waterhouse, 1845; Taphozous solifer Hollister, 1913

= Black-bearded tomb bat =

Species of bat

The black-bearded tomb bat (Taphozous melanopogon) is a species of sac-winged bat found in South and South East Asia.

== Taxonomy and etymology ==
It was described as a new species in 1841 by Dutch zoologist Coenraad Jacob Temminck. The holotype was collected on Java. Its species name "melanopogon" comes from Ancient Greek "mélās" meaning "black" and "pṓgōn" meaning "beard".

== Description ==
The black-bearded tomb bat has a forearm length of 55–68 mm (2.2–2.7 in). It has a small "beard", or a tuft of black fur on its chin. Its fur is blackish-brown, with individual hairs white at the base.

== Biology and ecology ==
The black-bearded tomb bat is highly colonial, forming large aggregations of up to 15,000 individuals while roosting. These roosts are located in temples, ruins, or caves. It is a seasonal breeder; young are born after a gestation length of 120–125 days. The typical litter size is one individual, though twins have been documented.

== Range and habitat ==
This species ranges widely throughout Asia and Southeast Asia. Its range includes the following countries: Brunei, Cambodia, China, India, Indonesia, Laos, Malaysia, Myanmar, Philippines, Singapore, Sri Lanka, Thailand, Timor-Leste, and Vietnam. It has been documented at elevations up to 800 m (2,600 ft) above sea level.

== See also ==
- List of mammals in Hong Kong
