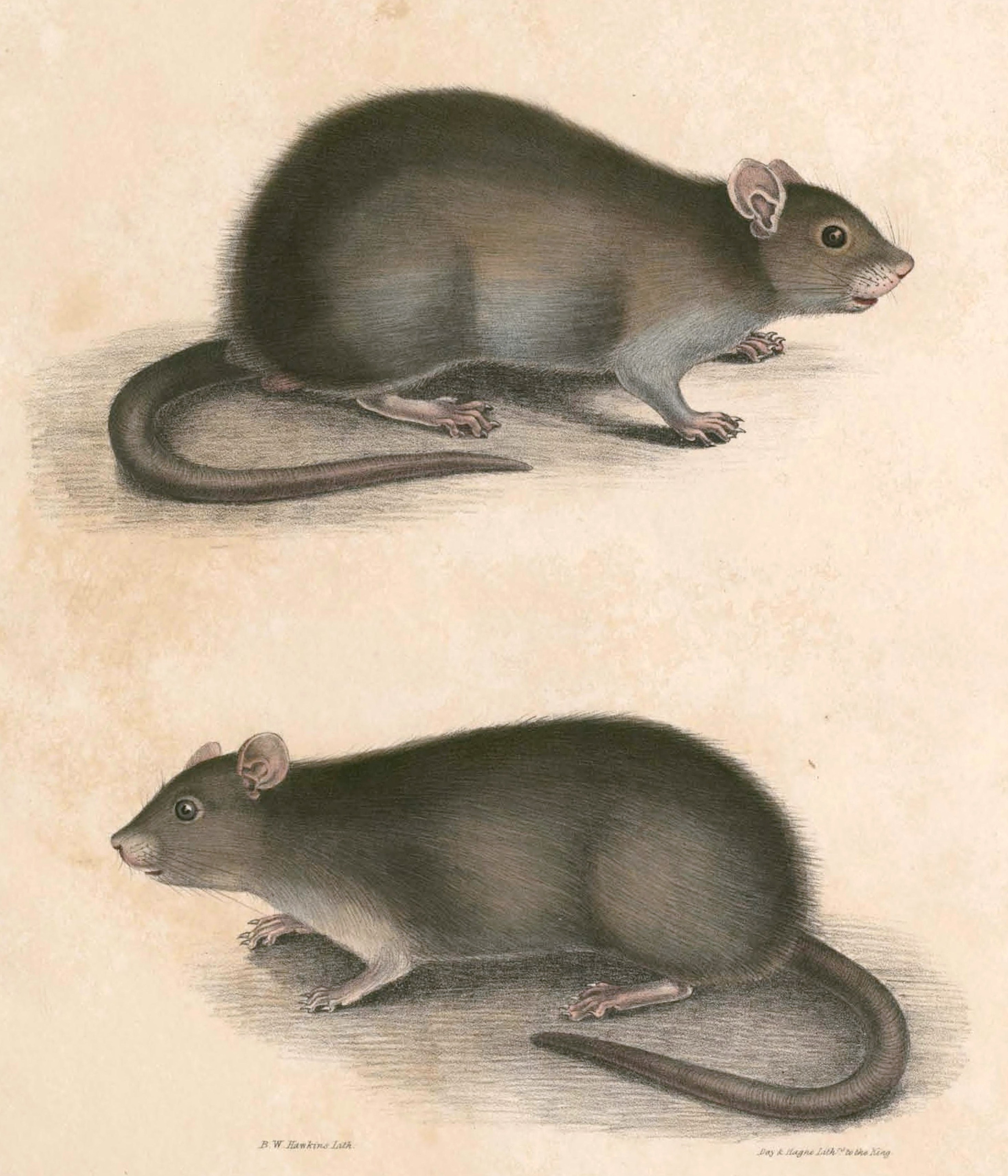
- Lesser bandicoot rat (Bandicota bengalensis)

Scientific classification
- Domain: Eukaryota
- Kingdom: Animalia
- Phylum: Chordata
- Class: Mammalia
- Order: Rodentia
- Family: Muridae
- Tribe: Rattini
- Genus: Bandicota; Gray, 1873

Type species
- Mus giganteus

Species
- Bandicota bengalensis Bandicota indica Bandicota savilei

= Bandicota =

Bandicota Temporal range: Holocene

Genus of rodents

Bandicota is a genus of rodents from Asia known as the bandicoot rats. Their common name and genus name are derived from the Telugu language word pandikokku (పందికొక్కు). DNA studies have found the group to be a monophyletic clade sister to the radiation of Molucca and Australian Rattus species as part of the paraphyletic Rattus sensu lato.

== Species ==
- Greater bandicoot rat (B. indica) Bechstein, 1800
- Lesser bandicoot rat (B. bengalensis) Gray and Hardwicke, 1833
- Savile's bandicoot rat (B. savilei) Thomas, 1916
