= Fringed long-footed myotis =

Conservation status
- Least Concern (IUCN 3.1)

Scientific classification
- Kingdom: Animalia
- Phylum: Chordata
- Class: Mammalia
- Order: Chiroptera
- Family: Vespertilionidae
- Genus: Myotis
- Species: M. fimbriatus

Binomial name
- Myotis fimbriatus Peters, 1871
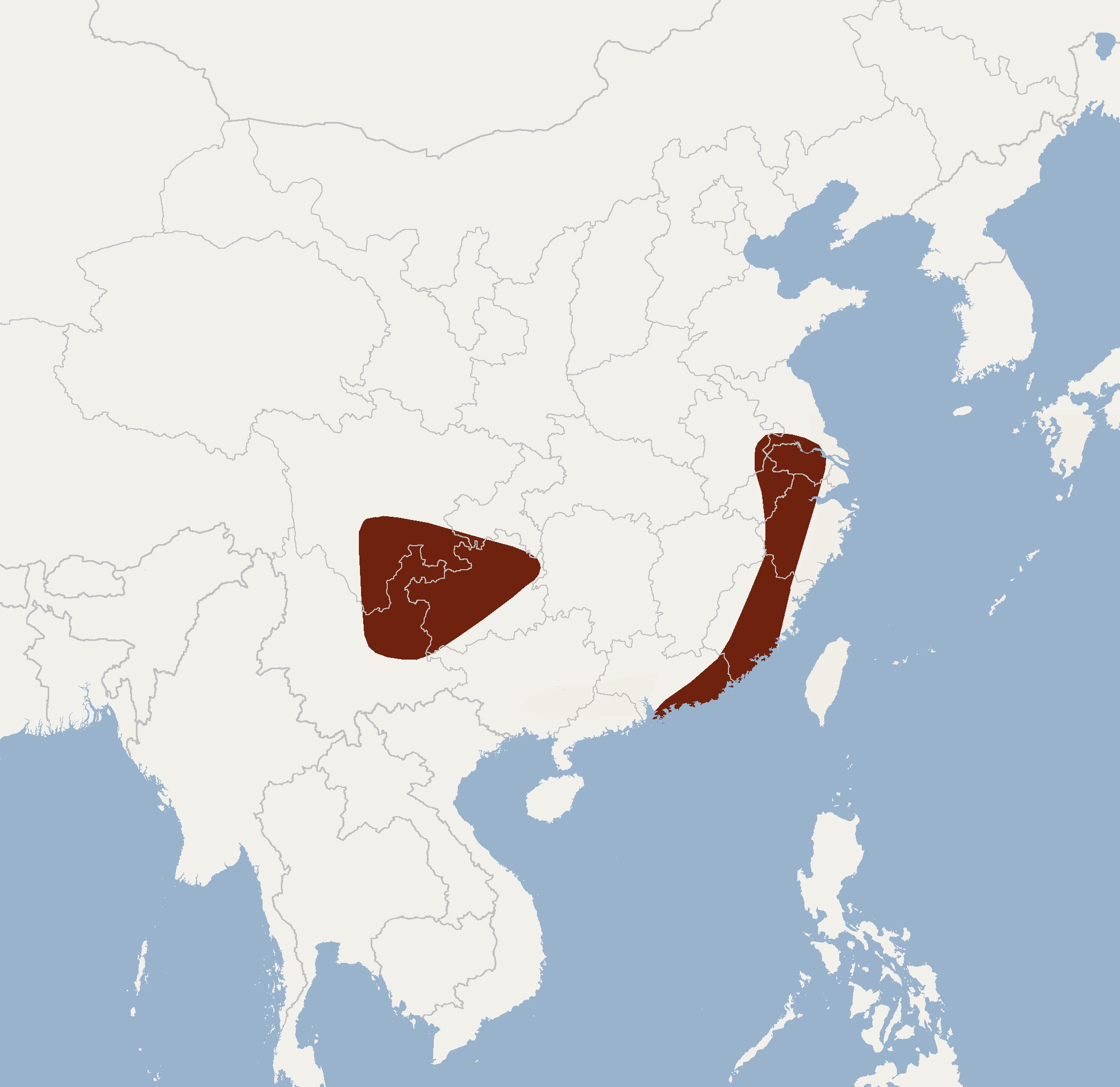
- Fringed long-footed myotis range (does not include taiwanensis)

Synonyms
- Vespertilio fimbriatus Peters in Swinhoe, 1870; Myotis taiwanensis Ärnbäck-Christie-Lide, 1908; Myotis hirsutus Powell, 1926; Myotis fimbriatus Tate 1941; Myotis taiwanensis Lin et al., 2004; Myotis adversus taiwanensis Simmons, 2005

Species of bat

The fringed long-footed myotis (Myotis fimbriatus) is a species of vesper bat in the family Vespertilionidae. It is found in China, Taiwan and Hong Kong.

The fringed long-footed myotis is described as having short, thick, brown fur with pale whitish fur ventrally. A captured female was measured with ears that were 14.4 mm (0.57 in) long, a forearm 42.2 mm (1.66 in) long, and a weight of 9.9 grams (0.35 oz). Myotis fimbriatus is listed as being of least concern by the IUCN as of 2008. In 2000, Myotis fimbriatus was listed as being "lower risk/near threatened".

The species Myotis taiwanensis, initially described as a subspecies of the large-footed bat (Myotis adversus) and reclassified into its own species in 2010, is now thought to be a subspecies of M. fimbriatus.
