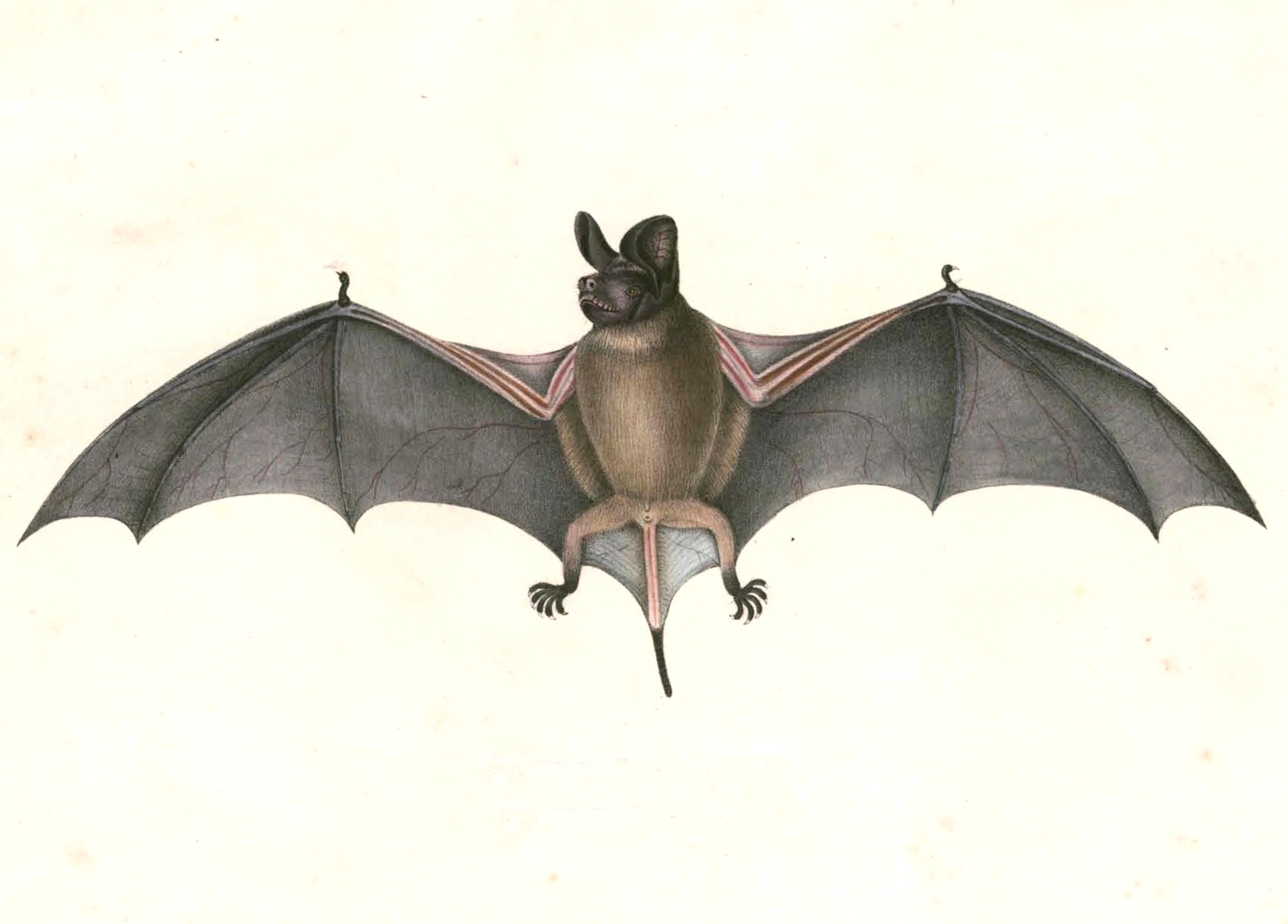

Conservation status
- Least Concern (IUCN 3.1)

Scientific classification
- Kingdom: Animalia
- Phylum: Chordata
- Class: Mammalia
- Infraclass: Placentalia
- Order: Chiroptera
- Family: Molossidae
- Genus: Mops
- Species: M. plicatus

Binomial name
- Mops plicatus Buchanan, 1800
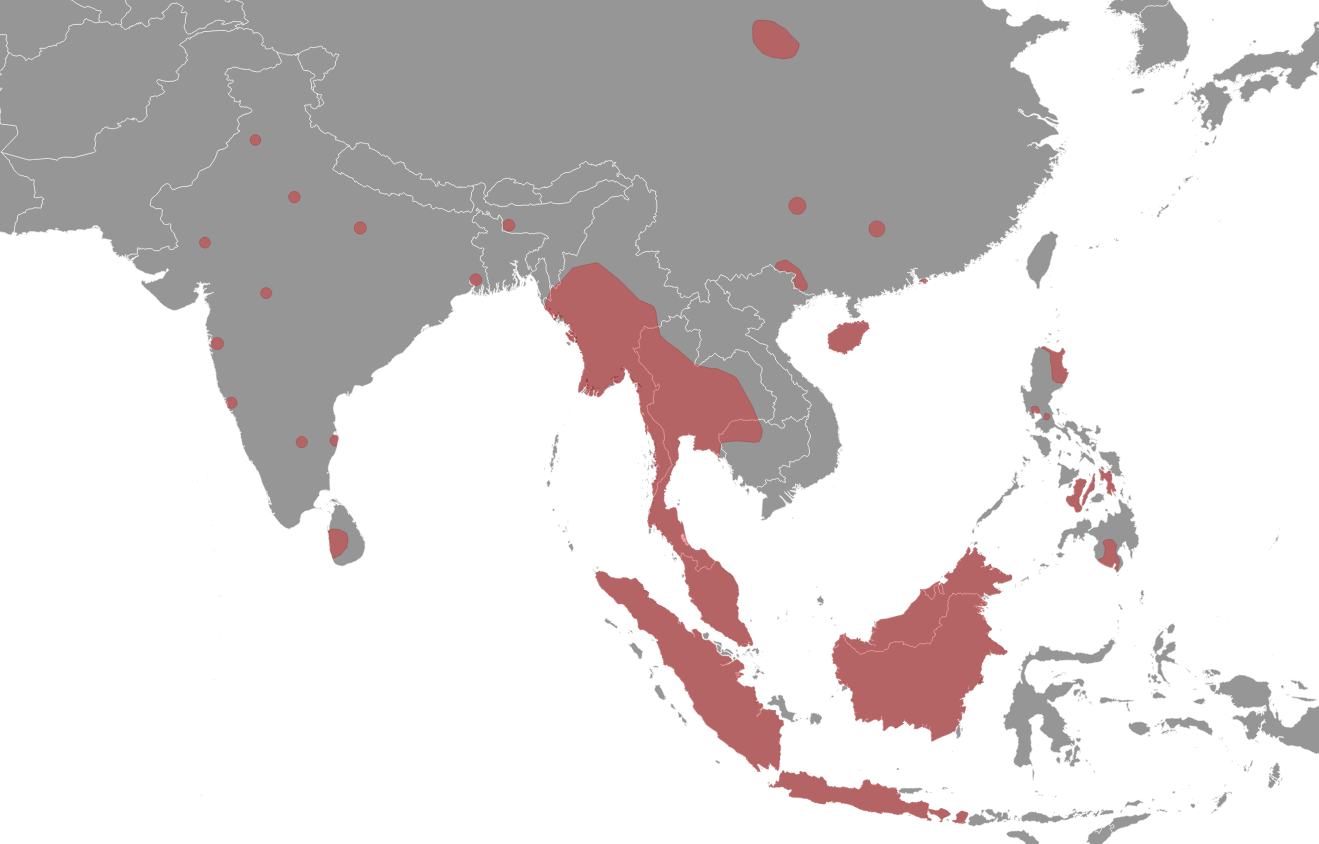

Synonyms
- Vespertilio plicatus Buchanan, 1800; Nyctinomus plicatus Buchanan, 1800

= Wrinkle-lipped free-tailed bat =

Species of bat

The wrinkle-lipped free-tailed bat (Mops plicatus) is a species of bat in the family Molossidae. It is found in Bangladesh, Bhutan, Cambodia, China, the Cocos (Keeling) Islands, India, Indonesia, Laos, Malaysia, Myanmar, Nepal, the Philippines, Sri Lanka, Thailand and Vietnam.

== Taxonomy and etymology ==
Colony emerging around sunset (Pak Chong, Thailand)

It was described as a new species in 1800 by Scottish scientist Francis Buchanan-Hamilton. Buchanan-Hamilton initially placed it into the genus Vespertilio, with the scientific name Vespertilio plicatus. Its species name "plicatus" is Latin for "folded," possibly referencing its wrinkled lips or its folded ears.

== Description ==
Its forearm length is 40–50 mm (1.6–2.0 in). Its fur is dark brown. Its dental formula is 1.1.2.32.1.2.3 for a total of 30 teeth.

== Range and habitat ==
Its range includes several countries and regions in South and Southeast Asia, including Cambodia, China, Hong Kong, India, Laos, Malaysia, Philippines, Sri Lanka, and Vietnam. It has been documented at elevations up to 950 m (3,120 ft).

== Conservation ==
As of 2020, it is evaluated as a least-concern species by the IUCN—its lowest conservation priority. It met the criteria for this classification because it has a wide geographic range; its range includes protected areas, its population size is large; and it is unlikely to be experiencing rapid population decline. However, some local populations may be threatened by overharvesting for bushmeat, habitat loss via deforestation, cave disturbance, and persecution of its roosts due to the perception that it is a pest. Examples of such human interference include in northern Myanmar as a result of limestone extraction for cement manufacture and a colony of hundreds of thousands of bats eradicated "as pests" in Phnom Pehn.

== See also ==
- List of mammals in Hong Kong
