= Rickett's big-footed bat =

Conservation status
- Vulnerable (IUCN 3.1)

Scientific classification
- Kingdom: Animalia
- Phylum: Chordata
- Class: Mammalia
- Order: Chiroptera
- Family: Vespertilionidae
- Genus: Myotis
- Species: M. pilosus

Binomial name
- Myotis pilosus Peters, 1869
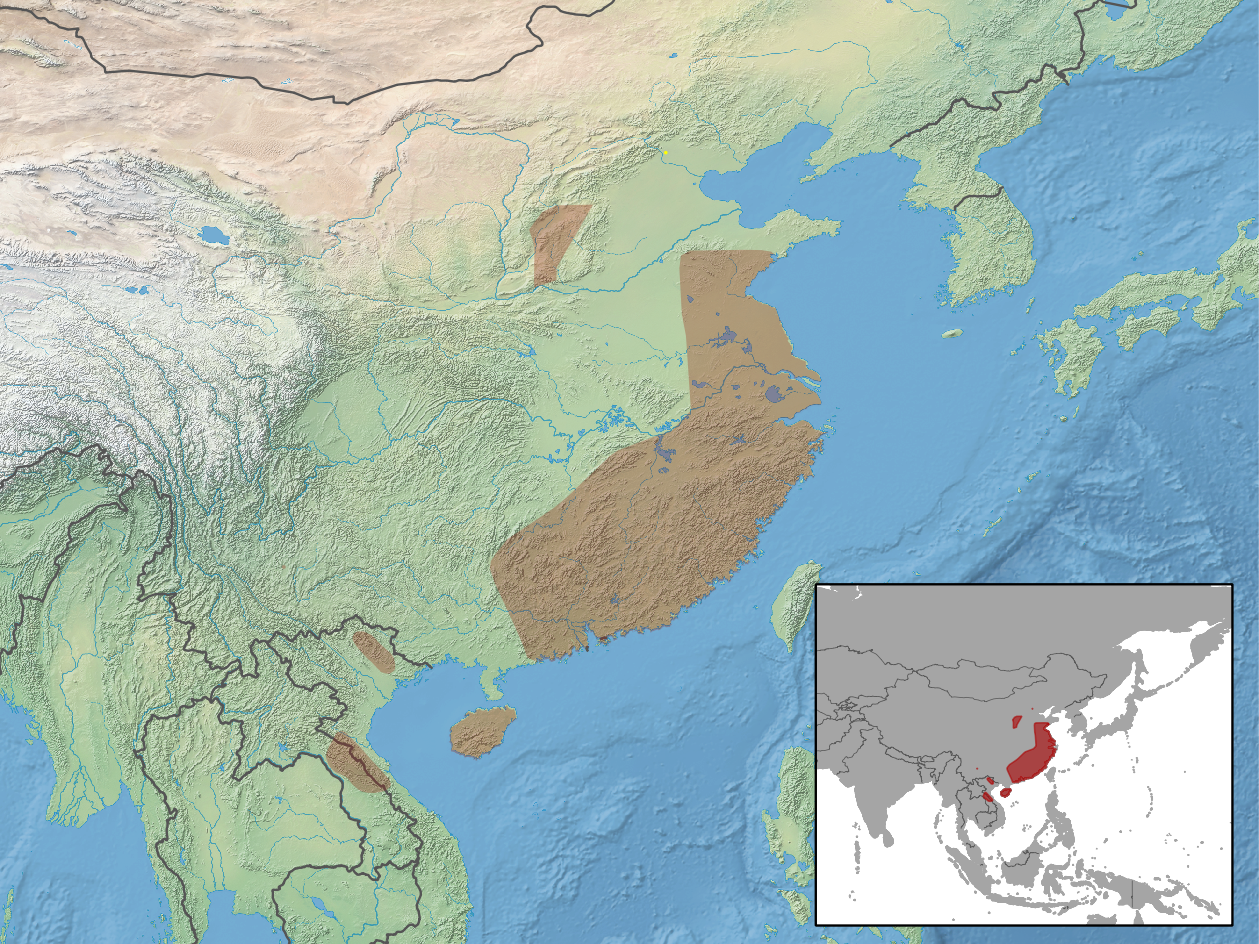

Synonyms
- Myotis ricketti (Thomas, 1894)

Species of bat

Rickett's big-footed bat (Myotis pilosus) is a species of vesper bat. It can be found in southern and eastern China, Vietnam, and Laos. This species has often been called Myotis ricketti, but the older M. pilosus has priority. The erroneous reporting of the type locality as being in Uruguay by Wilhelm Peters led to the dual naming.

Rickett's big-footed bat is a widely distributed habitat specialist that is strictly dependent on water since its diet consists in large proportion of fish. Near Beijing, its diet was 60% pale chub (Zacco platypus), and 13% water beetles. It is threatened by water pollution.

Rickett's big-footed bat was featured in the BBC video series Wild China.
