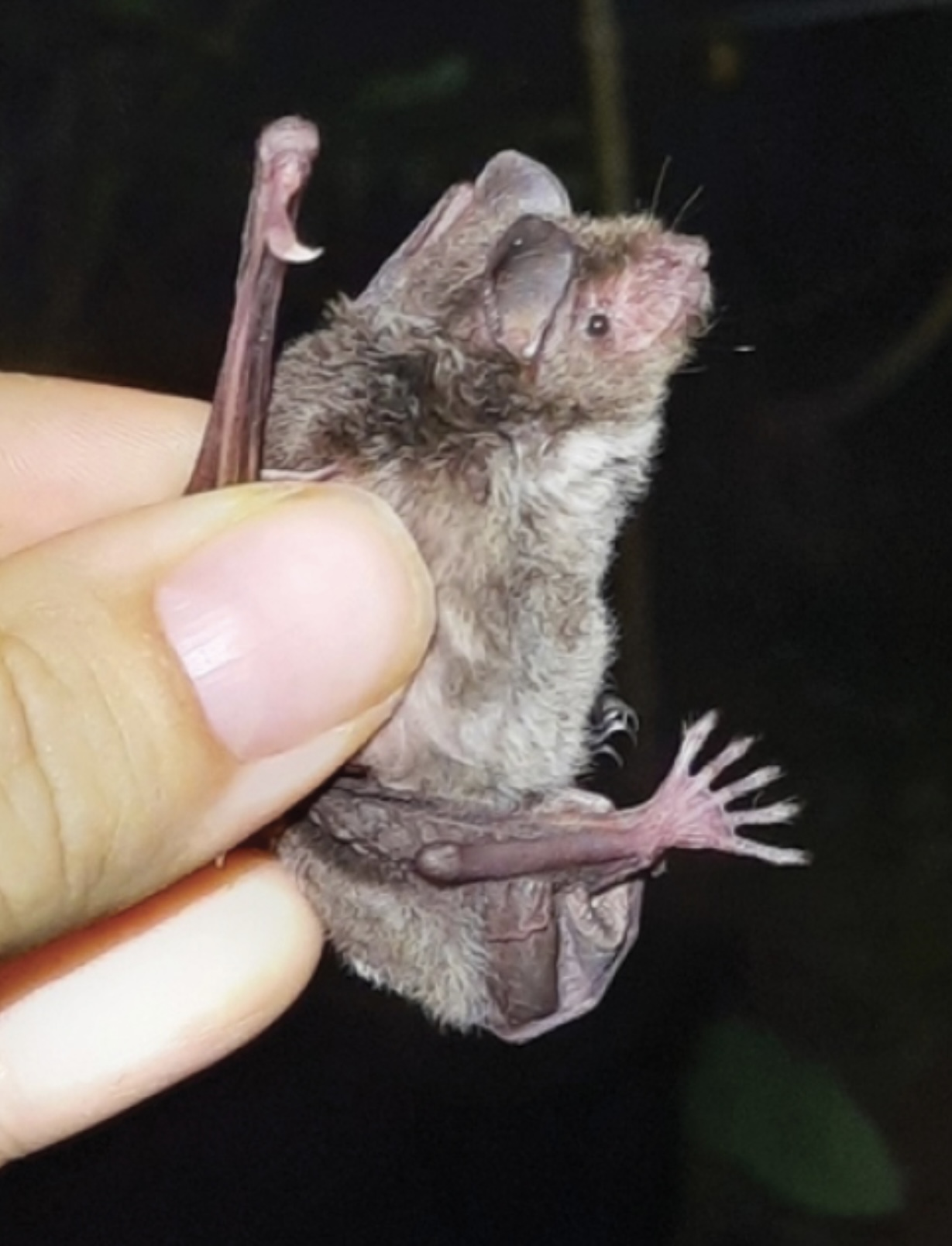

Conservation status
- Least Concern (IUCN 3.1)

Scientific classification
- Kingdom: Animalia
- Phylum: Chordata
- Class: Mammalia
- Order: Chiroptera
- Family: Vespertilionidae
- Genus: Myotis
- Species: M. horsfieldii

Binomial name
- Myotis horsfieldii Temminck, 1840
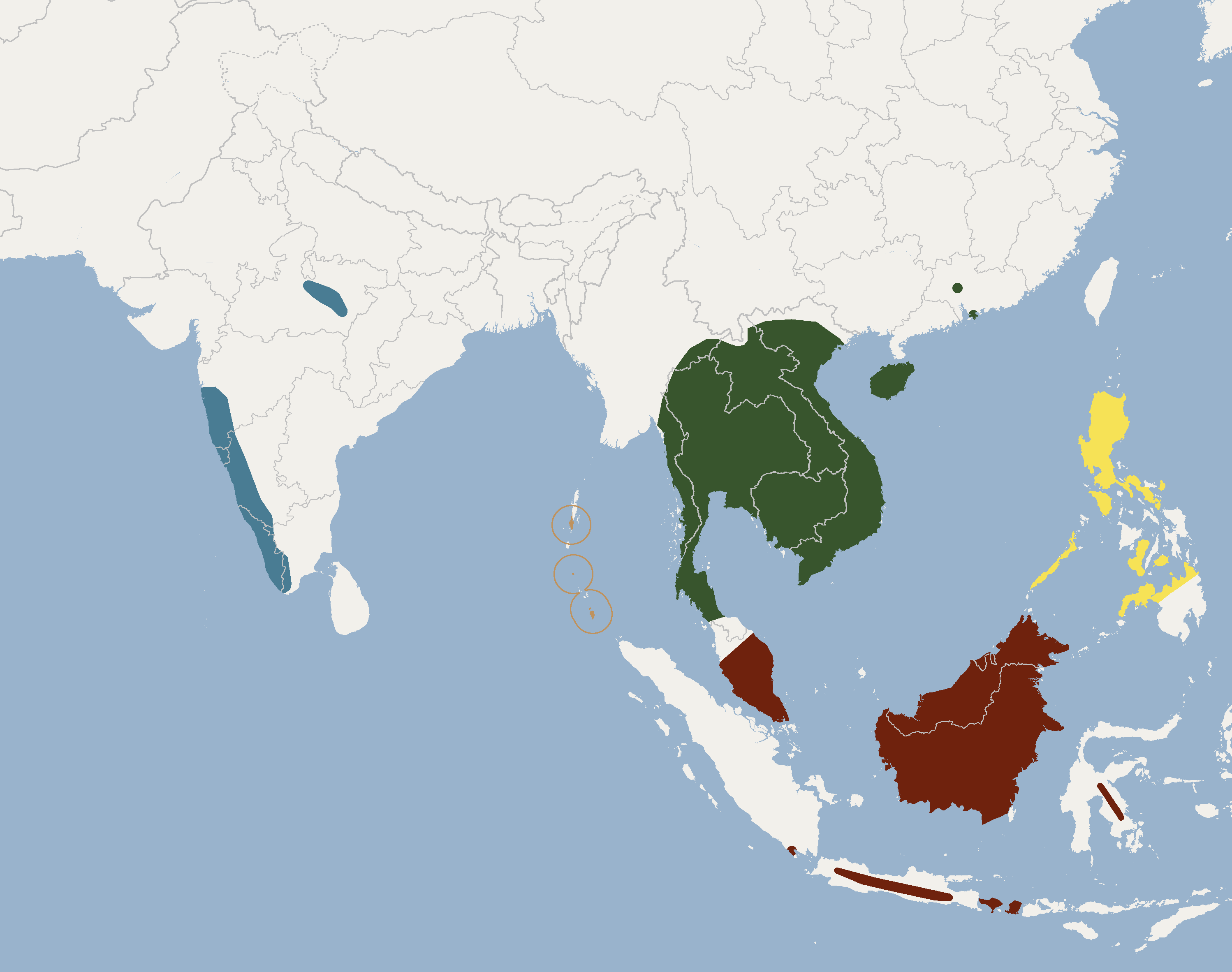

= Horsfield's bat =

Species of bat

Horsfield's bat (Myotis horsfieldii) is a species of vesper bat. It is found in China, India, Indonesia, Malaysia, Myanmar, the Philippines, Thailand, and Vietnam.

The follow subspecies are recognized:

- Myotis horsfieldii deignani Shamel, 1942
- Myotis horsfieldii dryas K. Andersen, 1907
- Myotis horsfieldii horsfieldii (Temminck, 1840)
- Myotis horsfieldii jeannei Taylor, 1934
- Myotis horsfieldii peshwa (Thomas, 1915)
