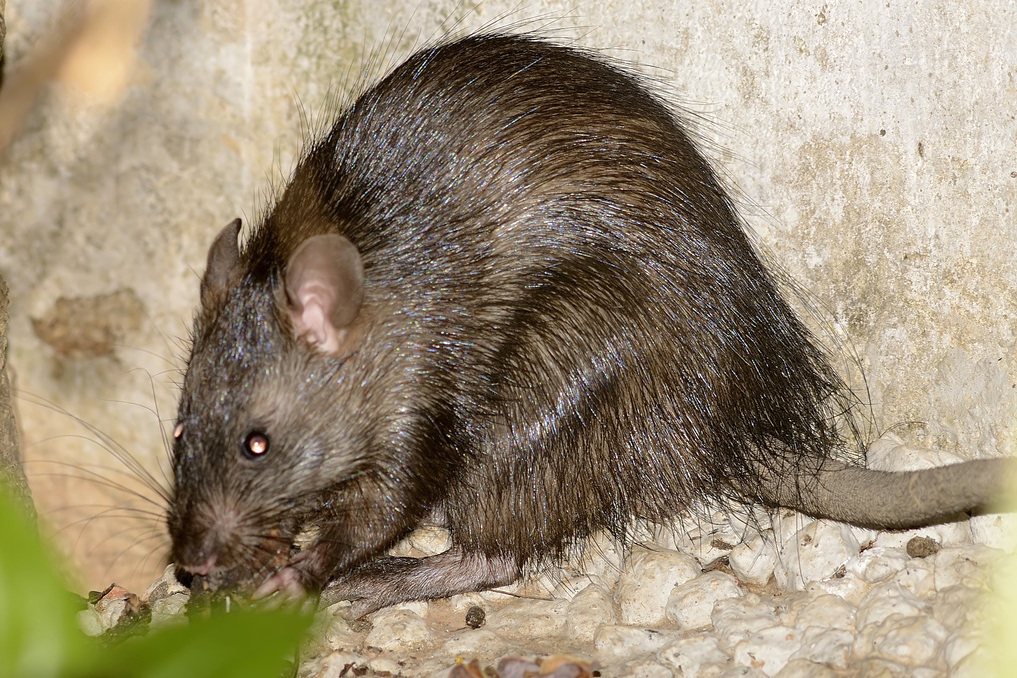
- Bandicota indica in southern India

Conservation status
- Least Concern (IUCN 3.1)

Scientific classification
- Kingdom: Animalia
- Phylum: Chordata
- Class: Mammalia
- Order: Rodentia
- Family: Muridae
- Genus: Bandicota
- Species: B. indica

Binomial name
- Bandicota indica (Bechstein, 1800)
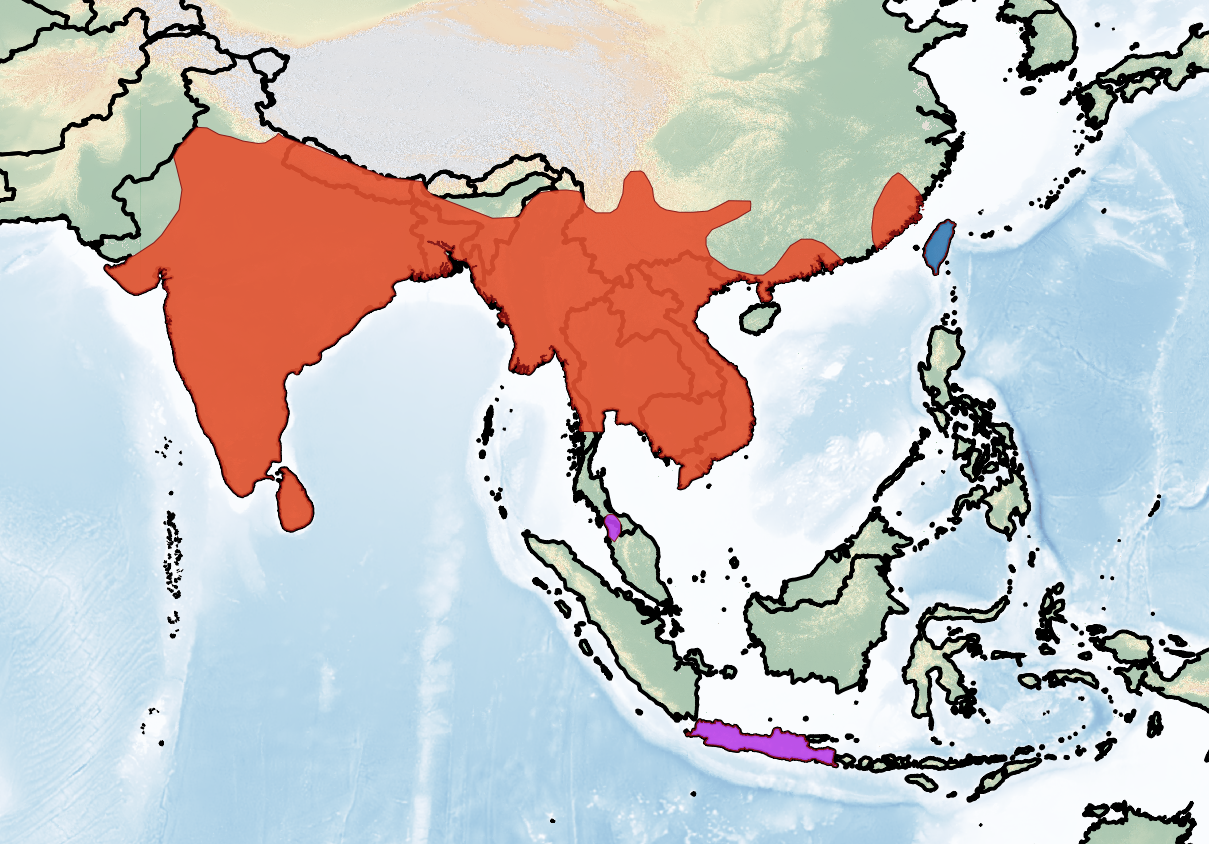

= Greater bandicoot rat =

Species of rodent

The greater bandicoot rat or Indian bandicoot rat (Bandicota indica) is a species of rodent in the family Muridae found in Bangladesh, China, India, eastern Pakistan, Indonesia, Laos, Malaysia, Myanmar, Nepal, Sri Lanka, Taiwan, Thailand, and Vietnam. It can grow to about 30–45 cm without including the tail which can grow to 28 cm. These should not be confused with marsupial bandicoots which inhabit Australia and neighbouring New Guinea, which were named after the bandicota rats.

== Description ==
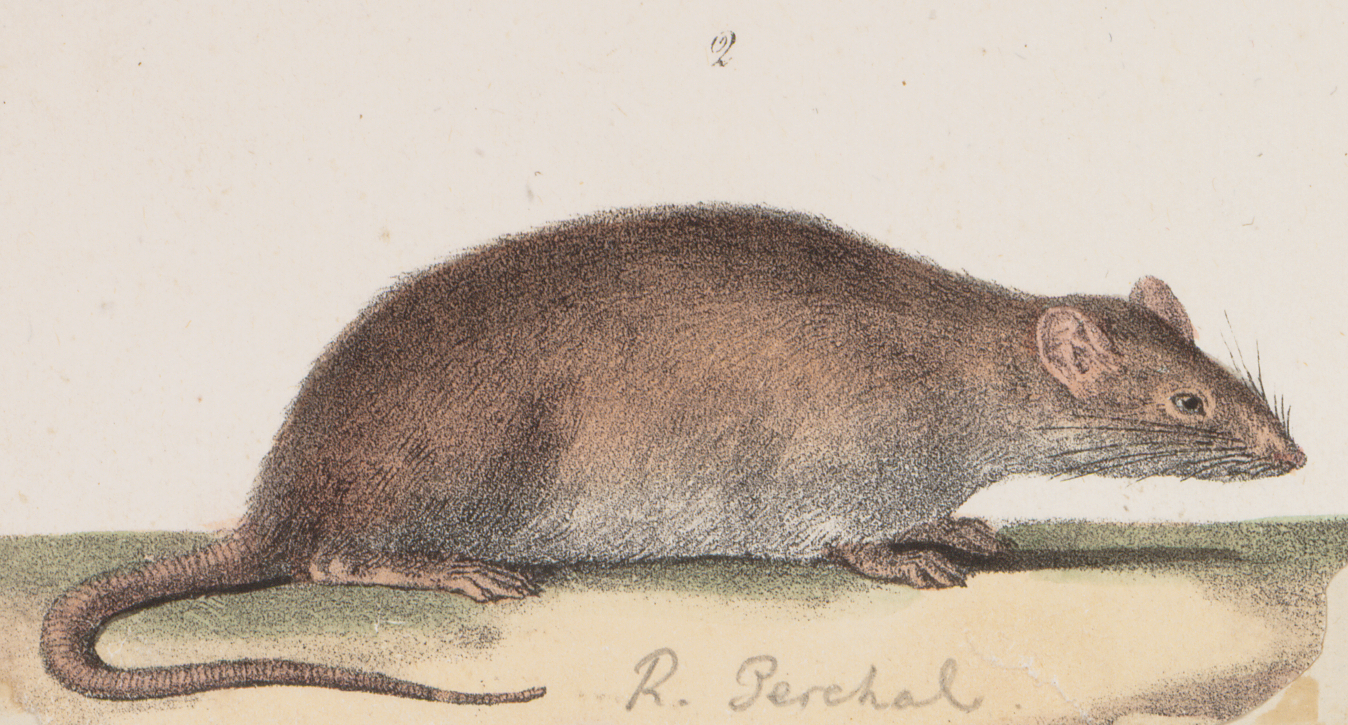
18th or 19th century description

The greater bandicoot rat also called perichali (Tamil) has a dark gray-brown upper parts with a profusion of long, black hairs. Sides are gray with a few long, black hairs. Short, light gray fur occurs on the ventral surfaces. It has a dark and naked, scaly tail, and dark feet with light-colored claws. The young are much lighter in colour. In Sinhala, the bandicoot rat is known as maha uru-meeya - මහ ඌරු මීයා, and in Malayalam, it is known as panni-eli - പന്നിയെലി, thorappan തോരപ്പൻ. Both names directly translate to "pig-rat". These are one of several animals called chuchundra in the Nepali language.

== Reproduction ==
A female has between 8 and 10 litters during her life. The young (8–14 rat pups per litter) are born blind and naked. Young reach sexual maturity around 50 to 60 days after birth. The lifespan of adults is around a year.

== Behaviour ==
Large, aggressive bandicoot rats erect their guard hairs on their backs and emit grunts when disturbed. If caged with other bandicoots, it is likely to fight to death within a few hours. They are so aggressive that sometimes dogs and cats are afraid of these bandicoot rats, which occupy the outskirts of human dwellings such as compounds and gardens and are commonly found near garbage bins. They are also occasionally found on the roadside. Sometimes they get run over by cars and die on the road. Burrowing habits cause great damage to grounds and flooring, as they can also tunnel through brick and masonry. Their characteristic large burrows give away their presence. They are not fastidious eaters, feeding on household refuse, grain, and vegetables, and are very serious pests in poultry farms. They are also a carrier for many diseases.

== Parasites ==
Parasites of Bandicota indica include:

- Schistosoma spindale
- Angiostrongylus cantonensis

== Rat-borne diseases ==
- Leptospirosis
- Hantavirus
- Babesiosis
- Bovine schistosomiasis
