= Western bent-winged bat =

Western Bent-Winged Bat

Conservation status
- Least Concern (IUCN 3.1)

Scientific classification
- Kingdom: Animalia
- Phylum: Chordata
- Class: Mammalia
- Order: Chiroptera
- Family: Miniopteridae
- Genus: Miniopterus
- Species: M. magnater

Binomial name
- Miniopterus magnater Sanborn, 1931
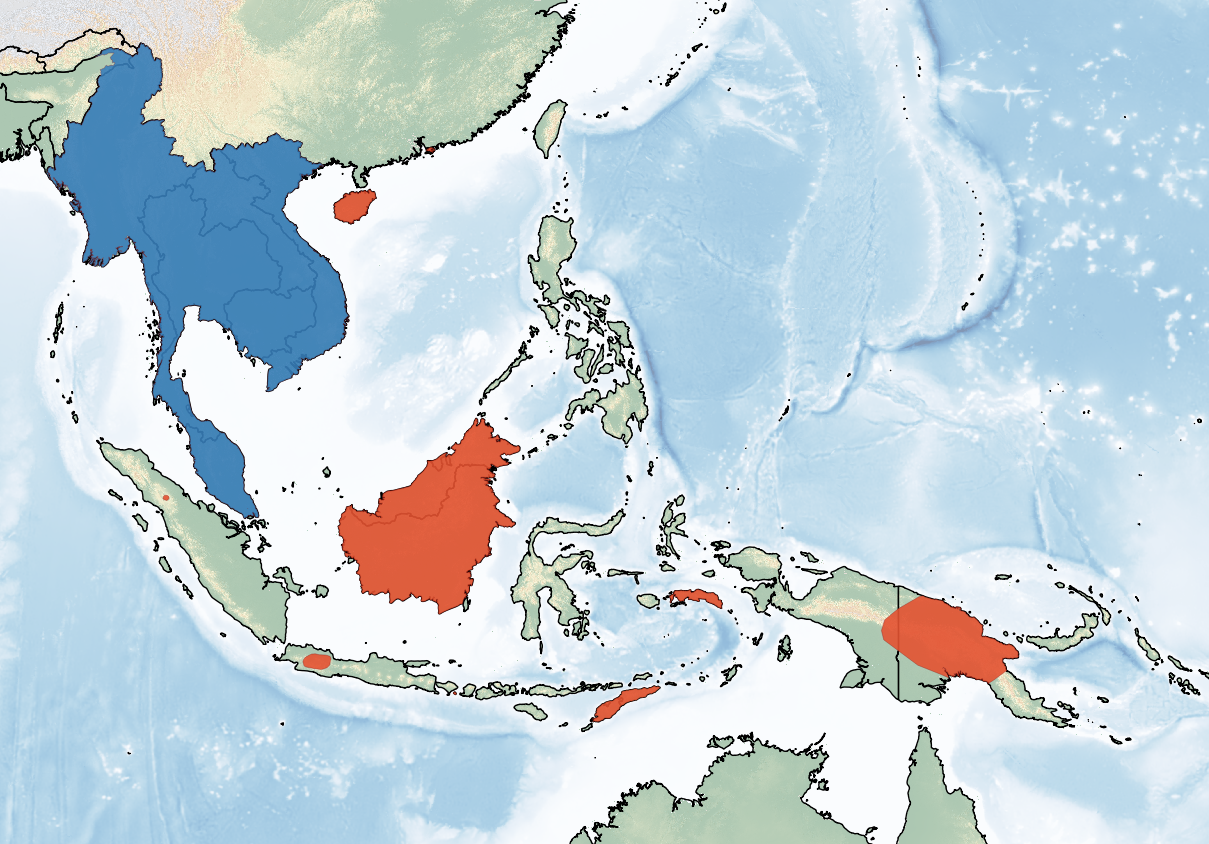

Species of bat

The western bent-winged bat (Miniopterus magnater) is a species of vesper bat in the family Miniopteridae. It can be found in the following countries: China, India, Indonesia, Laos, Malaysia, Myanmar, Papua New Guinea, Thailand, Timor-Leste, and Vietnam.
