= Mongolian vole =

Conservation status
- Least Concern (IUCN 3.1)

Scientific classification
- Kingdom: Animalia
- Phylum: Chordata
- Class: Mammalia
- Order: Rodentia
- Family: Cricetidae
- Subfamily: Arvicolinae
- Genus: Alexandromys
- Species: A. mongolicus

Binomial name
- Alexandromys mongolicus (Radde, 1861)

Synonyms
- Arvicola mongolicus Radde, 1861; Microtus arvalis subsp. baicalensis Fetisov, 1941; Microtus mongolicus (Radde, 1861); Microtus poljakovi Kastschenko, 1901; Microtus xerophilus Skalon, 1936

Species of rodent

The Mongolian vole (Alexandromys mongolicus) is a species of rodent in the family Cricetidae. It is found in China, Mongolia, and Russia.
