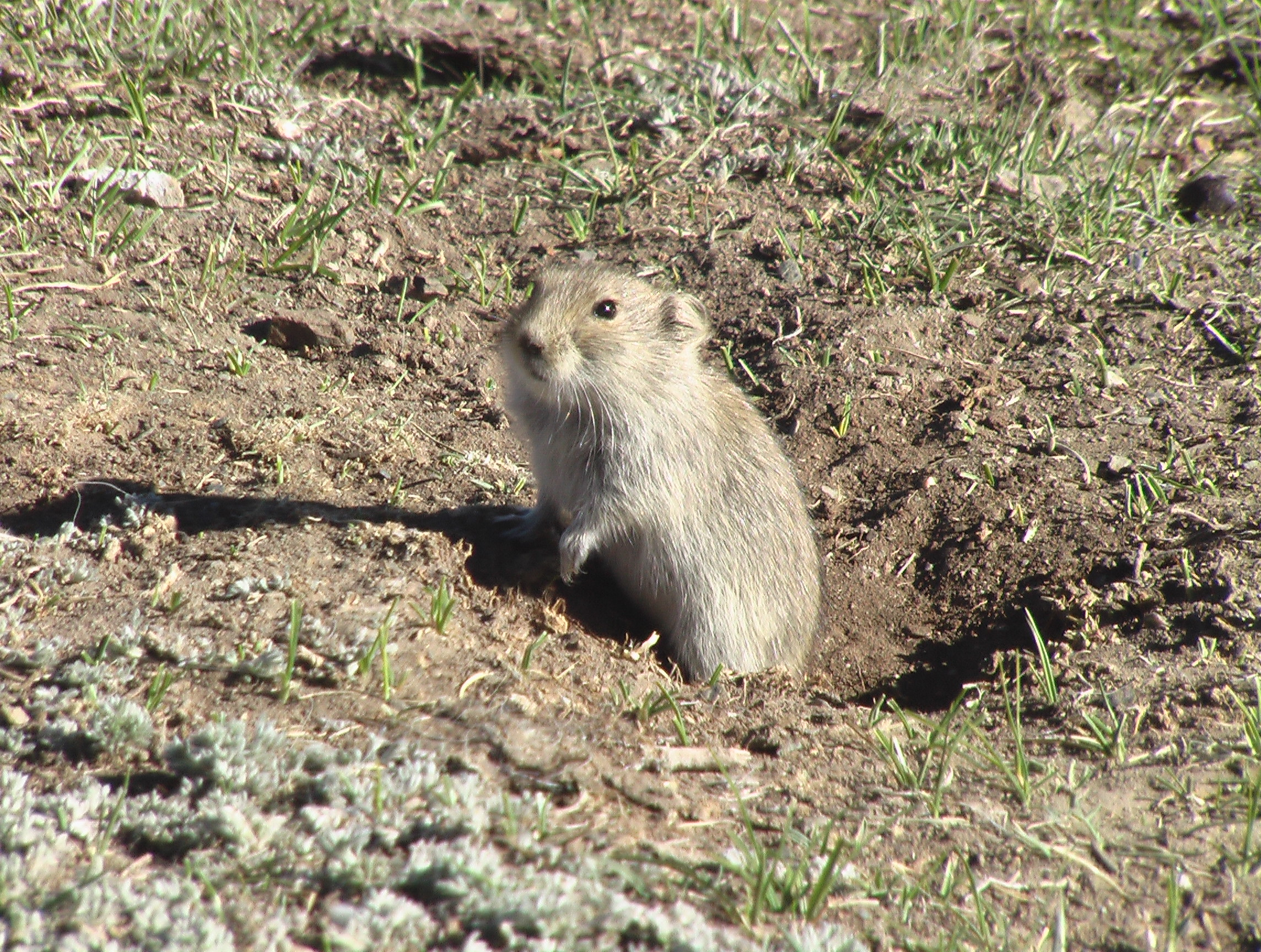

Conservation status
- Least Concern (IUCN 3.1)

Scientific classification
- Kingdom: Animalia
- Phylum: Chordata
- Class: Mammalia
- Order: Rodentia
- Family: Cricetidae
- Subfamily: Arvicolinae
- Genus: Lasiopodomys
- Species: L. brandtii

Binomial name
- Lasiopodomys brandtii (Radde, 1861)

Synonyms
- L. aga (Kastschenko, 1912); L. hangaicus (Bannikov, 1948); L. warringtoni (Miller, 1913); Microtus brandti aga (Kastschenko, 1912); Microtus warringtoni (Miller, 1913)

= Brandt's vole =

Brandt's Vole

Species of rodent

Brandt's vole, (Lasiopodomys brandtii), also known as the steppe vole, is a species of rodent in the family Cricetidae. It is native to shrublands and grasslands in Russia, Mongolia and northern China.

== Characteristics ==
Brandt's vole is about 15 cm (5.9 in) long with a tail up to 3.5 cm (1.4 in) long. Its ears are small and the short fur is uniform sandy-brown, paler underneath. The tail is entirely brown and there are dense hairs on the hind part of the feet.

== Distribution and habitat ==
Brandt's vole is found in Nei Mongol, Jilin, and Hebei provinces in north-east China, in Mongolia and southern Transbaikalia in Russia. Brandt's vole is commonly found in grassland areas. Its typical habitat is dry steppes and pastures. Its sometimes also found in lakeside meadows and river valleys.

== Behaviour and ecology ==
Brandt's vole is a colonial species. Each family establishes a network of burrows with several entrances, long passages, storerooms, and nesting chambers. The voles are active during both the day and night and their behaviour varies at different times of year. They feed on both the underground and aerial parts of plants. Large stores of food are laid up before the winter and the energy intake of the voles seems to be correlated with the length of day. There are four or five broods each year, with each litter consisting of about seven young. Population levels are subject to wide swings. Under unfavourable conditions, this vole can be wiped out of some of the regions in which it is normally found, but when the conditions are right, mass outbreaks can occur. This periodically happens in Mongolia when millions of hectares of pasture are invaded. Under this onslaught, the pastures can become very bare, poor subsoil can be brought to the surface by burrowing activities and coarse weeds can become established, seriously harming the grazing for domestic animals.

=== Cold adaptations ===
When exposed to cold temperatures, voles increase their resting metabolic rate. This increase is caused by increased activity from mitochondria in the vole's brown fat, as more energy is used in nonshivering thermogenesis to generate heat. Nonshivering thermogenesis, decreased serum leptin levels, fat mobilization, and hyperphagia are all associated adaptations that the Brandt's voles undergoes in cold environments. Hyperphagia leading to increased food intake is highest in colder months, but voles expend so much energy during this period that they weigh less in summer months.
