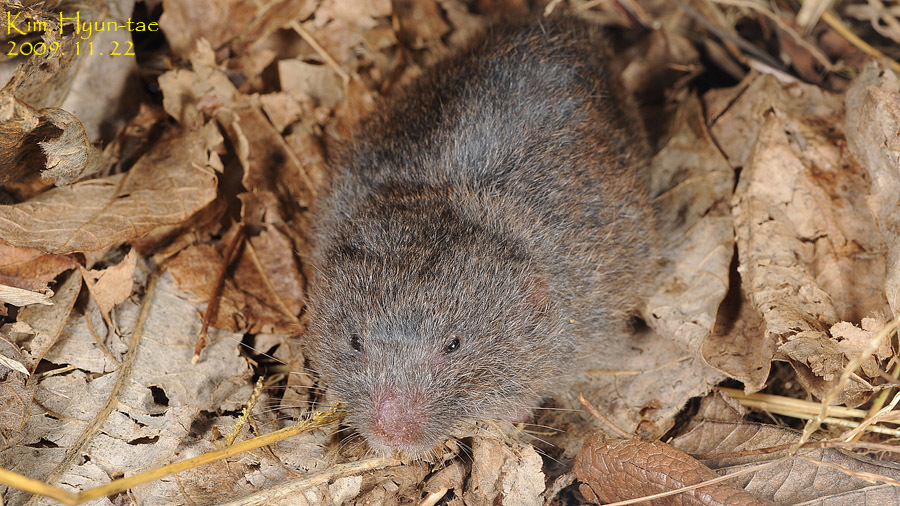

Conservation status
- Least Concern (IUCN 3.1)

Scientific classification
- Kingdom: Animalia
- Phylum: Chordata
- Class: Mammalia
- Order: Rodentia
- Family: Cricetidae
- Subfamily: Arvicolinae
- Genus: Lasiopodomys
- Species: L. mandarinus

Binomial name
- Lasiopodomys mandarinus (A. Milne-Edwards, 1871)

= Mandarin vole =

Species of rodent

The mandarin vole (Lasiopodomys mandarinus) is a species of vole found in central China as well as the southern and central Korean Peninsula. An adult mandarin vole is typically of about 115 millimetres (4.5 in) in length, in addition to about 28 mm (1.1 in) of tail. It is smaller and darker in color than the reed vole, Microtus fortis.
