= Radde's vole =

Conservation status
- Least Concern (IUCN 3.1)

Scientific classification
- Kingdom: Animalia
- Phylum: Chordata
- Class: Mammalia
- Order: Rodentia
- Family: Cricetidae
- Subfamily: Arvicolinae
- Genus: Stenocranius
- Species: S. raddei

Binomial name
- Stenocranius raddei (Poljakov, 1881)

Synonyms
- Lasiopodomys gregalis subsp. raddei (Poljakov, 1881)

Species of rodent

Radde's vole (Stenocranius raddei) is a species of rodent in the family Cricetidae. It is found in Russia and Mongolia. It was formerly considered a subspecies of the narrow-headed vole (Stenocranius gregalis). It is named after the Russian botanist Gustav Radde.
