= Maximowicz's vole =

Conservation status
- Least Concern (IUCN 3.1)

Scientific classification
- Kingdom: Animalia
- Phylum: Chordata
- Class: Mammalia
- Order: Rodentia
- Family: Cricetidae
- Subfamily: Arvicolinae
- Genus: Alexandromys
- Species: A. maximowiczii

Binomial name
- Alexandromys maximowiczii (Schrenck, 1859)

Synonyms
- Arvicola maximowiczii Schrenk, 1859; Microtus maximowiczii (Schrenk, 1859); Microtus michnoi subsp. ungurensis Kastschenko, 1913

Species of rodent

Maximowicz's vole (Alexandromys maximowiczii) is a species of rodent in the family Cricetidae. It is found in northeastern China, Mongolia, and eastern Russia.

== Description ==
Maximowicz's vole is one of the largest voles in the genus Alexandromys. Adults grow to a head-and-body length of 116 to 155 mm (4.6 to 6.1 in) with a tail length of 37 to 60 mm (1.5 to 2.4 in). The fur on the back is dark brownish-black with ochre specks, and the flanks are paler brown, blending gradually into the greyish-white underparts. The upper sides of the hands and feet are whitish-brown. The tail is either uniform dark brown or bicoloured, with the upper side dark brown and the underside white. Its scientific and common names commemorate the prominent Russian botanist Karl Maximovich, who was curator of the herbarium at the Saint Petersburg Botanical Garden at the time the vole was described by Leopold von Schrenck.

== Distribution and habitat ==
Maximowicz's vole is found in eastern Asia. Its range extends from Lake Baikal eastward to the mountains of northeastern Mongolia, the Amur River basin and northeastern China. Its typical habitats are forest and steppe and it is found in areas of dense vegetation in valleys and foothills.

== Behaviour ==
Maximowicz's vole is most active early in the morning and shortly before nightfall when it emerges from its burrow to feed on grasses and other plant material. The entrance to the burrow has a spoil heap which may be up to 100 cm (39 in) in diameter and 20 cm (8 in) in height. The tunnel itself is quite short and terminates in a nest chamber some 35 cm (14 in) in diameter and 25 cm (10 in) high. Other side chambers are used for storing roots and bulbs for winter food. Not much is known of the breeding habits of Maximowicz's vole but females have been reported as carrying seven and nine embryos.

== Status ==
Maximowicz's vole has a very wide range. It is common in much of that range and faces no particular identified threats, so the International Union for Conservation of Nature has assessed its conservation status as being of "least concern".
