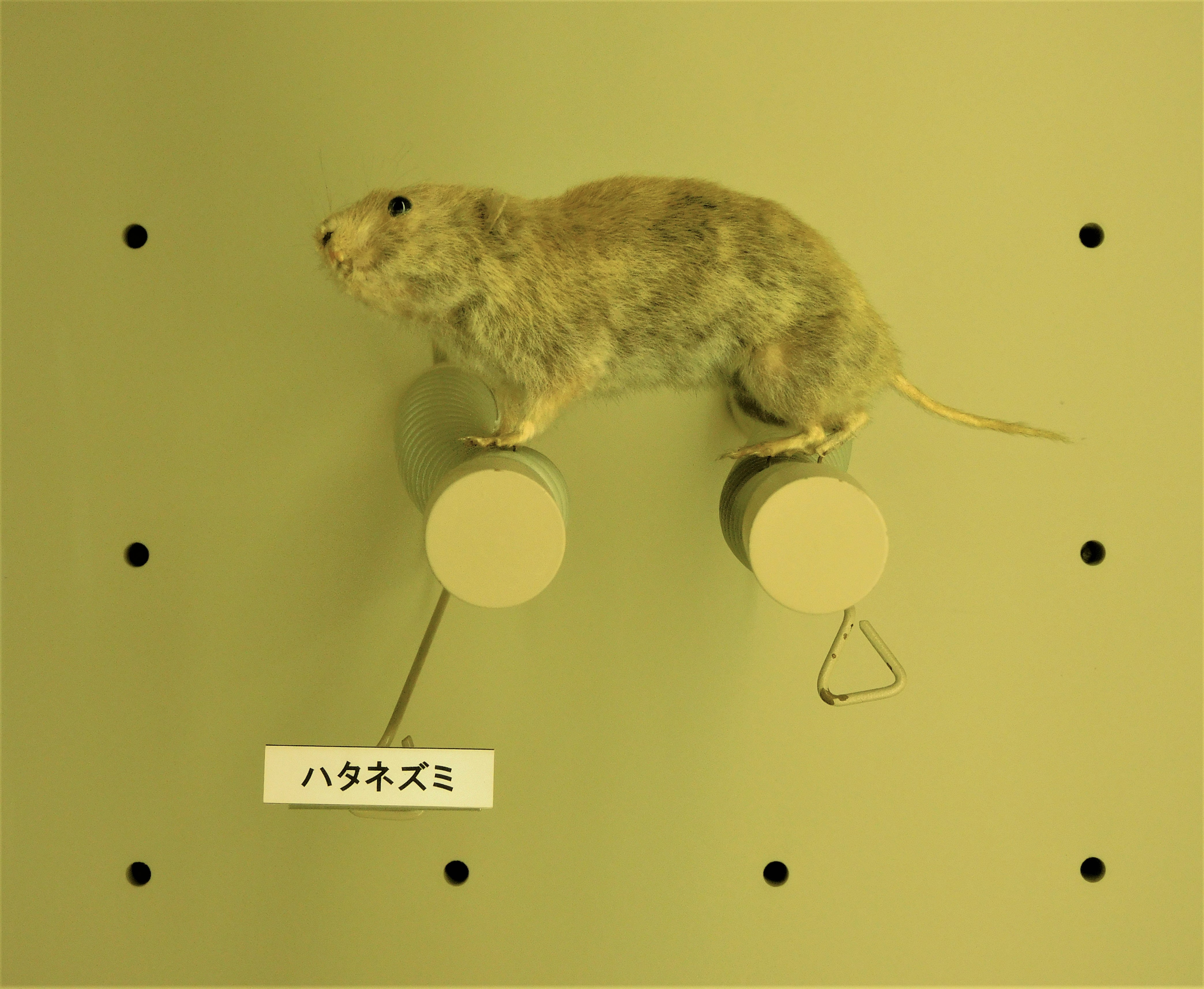
- Taxidermy (Tochigi Prefectural Museum)

Conservation status
- Least Concern (IUCN 3.1)

Scientific classification
- Kingdom: Animalia
- Phylum: Chordata
- Class: Mammalia
- Order: Rodentia
- Family: Cricetidae
- Subfamily: Arvicolinae
- Genus: Alexandromys
- Species: A. montebelli

Binomial name
- Alexandromys montebelli (Milne-Edwards, 1872)

Synonyms
- Arvicola montebelli Milne-Edwards, 1872; Microtus montebelli (Milne-Edwards, 1872)

= Japanese grass vole =

Species of rodent

The Japanese grass vole (Alexandromys montebelli) is a species of rodent in the family Cricetidae. It was discovered by Alphonse Milne-Edwards in 1872. It is found only in Japan.
