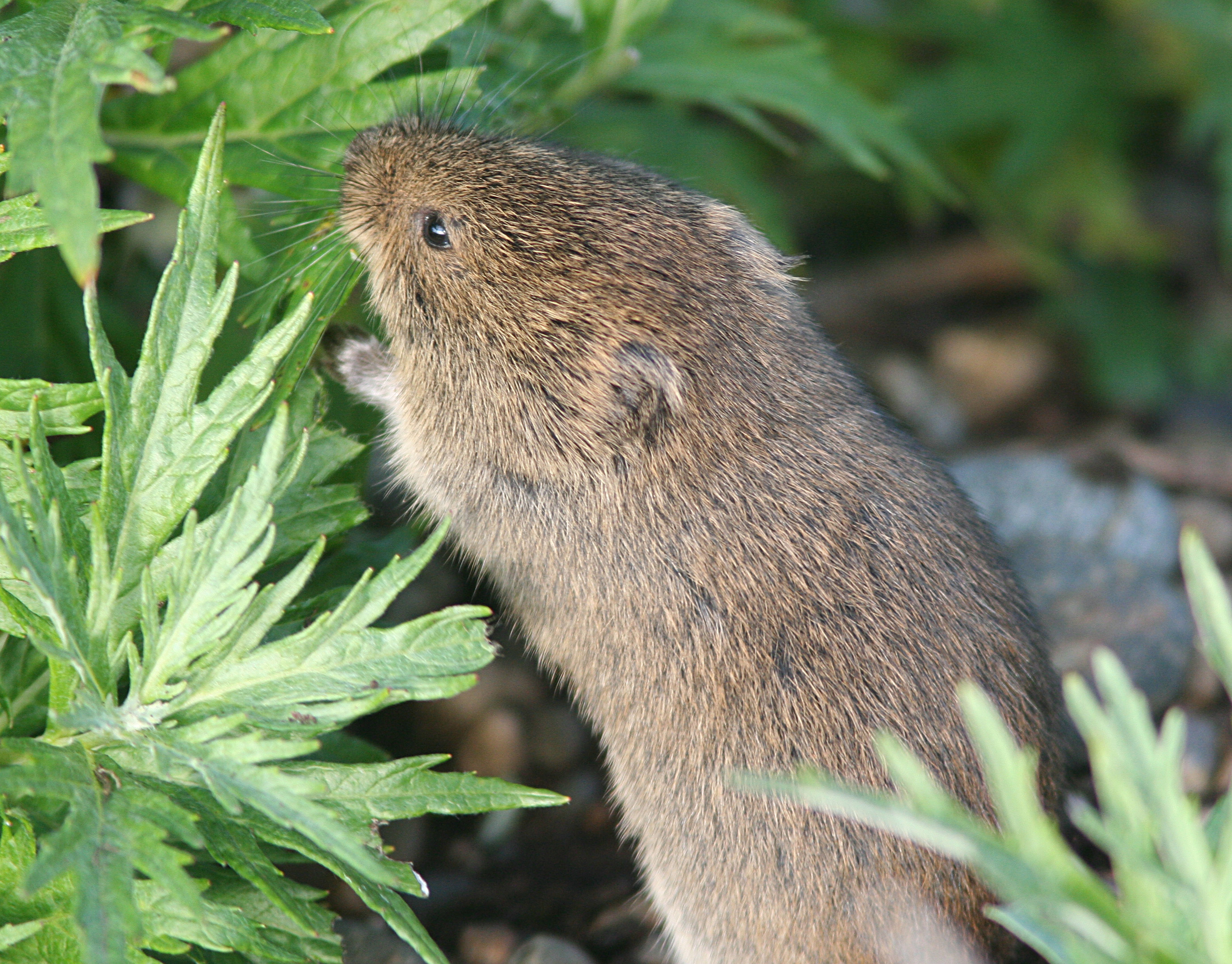
- Tundra vole in Alaska

Conservation status
- Least Concern (IUCN 3.1)

Scientific classification
- Kingdom: Animalia
- Phylum: Chordata
- Class: Mammalia
- Order: Rodentia
- Family: Cricetidae
- Subfamily: Arvicolinae
- Genus: Alexandromys
- Species: A. oeconomus

Binomial name
- Alexandromys oeconomus (Pallas, 1776)

Synonyms
- Microtus oeconomus (Pallas, 1776); Mus oeconomus Pallas, 1776

= Tundra vole =

Species of rodent

The tundra vole (Alexandromys oeconomus) or root vole is a medium-sized vole found in Northern and Central Europe, Asia, and northwestern North America, including Alaska and northwestern Canada. In the western part of the Netherlands, the tundra vole is a relict from the ice age and has developed into the subspecies A. o. arenicola.

== Description ==
The tundra vole has short ears and a short tail. Its fur is yellowish brown with paler sides and white underparts. It is typically about 18 cm (7.1 in) long with a 4 cm (1.6 in) tail and a weight of about 50 grams (1.8 oz).

The tundra vole displays sexual dimorphism, with males being noticeably larger than the females as adults.

== Habitat ==
The tundra vole is found in damp tundra or moist meadows, usually near water.

== Behaviour and diet ==
This species makes runways through the surface growth in warm weather and tunnels through the snow in winter. It feeds on grasses, sedges and seeds. It is active year-round. It also digs burrows where it stores seeds and roots, especially licorice root, for the winter. A dental mesowear analysis of the tundra vole compared to the common vole found that the former consumed more abrasive foods overall.

== Breeding ==
Female voles have three to six litters of three to nine young in a shallow burrow. The tundra vole has its highest fecundity during May and June, but can prolong its mating season all the way until winter.

== Subspecies ==
Subspecies are as follows:

- A. o. amakensis - Amak Island tundra vole - Alaska, United States
- A. o. arenicola - Dutch tundra vole - Netherlands
- A. o. elymocetes - Montague Island tundra vole - Alaska, United States
- A. o. finmarchicus - Norwegian tundra vole - Norway
- A. o. innuitus - St. Lawrence Island tundra vole - Alaska, United States
- A. o. medius - Norwegian tundra vole - Norway
- A. o. mehelyi - Central European tundra vole - Austria, Hungary and Slovakia
- A. o. oeconomus - nominate subspecies - widespread
- A. o. popofensis - Shumagin Islands tundra vole - Alaska, United States
- A. o. punakensis - Punuk Islands tundra vole - Alaska, United States
- A. o. sitkensis - Alexander Archipelago tundra vole - Alaska, United States
- A. o. unalascensis - Unalaska Island tundra vole - Alaska, United States

=== Genetic variability ===
The large number of subspecies of A. oeconomus is due to the changing environment that they have had to endure since the glacier/ice-age, as well as the isolation of populations. Human interaction also greatly affects the environment of this species. As a result, voles have lost genetic diversity as seen through a lessened heterozygous population for certain genes within separated populations. Roads and structures do not necessarily limit species interaction, but it is the distances created between other communities of voles that limit gene flow.
