= Peter Carl Ludwig Schwarz =

Baltic German astronomer (1822–1894)

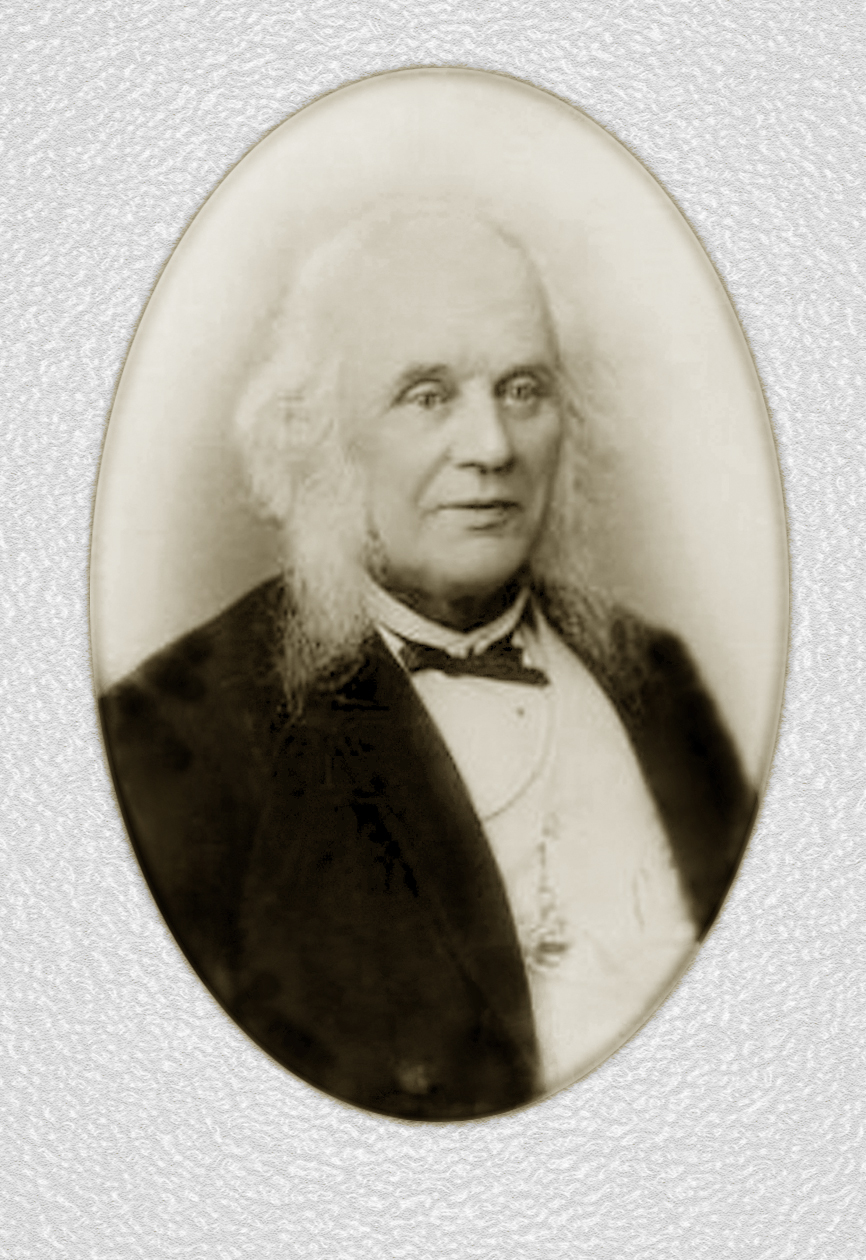
- Professor Ludwig Schwarz, circa 1890
- Born: 4 June 1822; Danzig-Gdańsk
- Died: 29 September 1894 (aged 72); St. George's?
- Awards: Konstantin Gold Medal; Demidov Prize (1865)
- Scientific career
- Fields: astronomy, geodesy
- Workplaces: Imperial University of Dorpat

Peter Carl Ludwig Schwarz (Julian, O.S.: 23 May 1822, Danzig-Gdańsk – 17 September 1894, St. George's?, buried in Tartu)(Gregorian, N.S.: 4 June 1822 – 29 September 1894), referred to mostly as Ludwig Schwarz, was a Baltic German astronomer of Imperial Russia, explorer, and professor of astronomy at the University of Dorpat honored with the Konstantin Medal (Note: The Konstantin Medal is named after Grand Duke Konstantin Nikolayevich of Russia, the first chairman of the Russian Geographical Society.) of the Imperial Russian Geographical Society. Schwarz also was a recipient of the Demidov Prize (Note: The Demidov Medal/Demidov Prize was an influencing forerunner to the Nobel Prize.) of the Academy of Sciences of St. Petersburg in 1865 for his work in geodesy.

== Palaeoarctic Siberian Asia Expeditions ==
Following assignment by Friedrich Georg Wilhelm Struve as a field expedition astronomer (1849–1853) to study the Amur River, astronomer Schwarz led (1854–1862) the East Siberian Expedition of 1855 which extensively explored unknown and unmapped territory in Eastern Siberia, such as the Turan Range and the North Baikal Highlands.

The Siberian expedition went into central Asia, southeastern Asia, and northern China. Some of the routes travelled were as long as 10,000 miles. Utilizing his prior Amur field knowledge of astronomy he would determine geographical positions of certain points (geodesy) for preparation of geographical maps. The information would later be used in planning the construction of the Trans-Siberian Railway systems and others in southeast Asia.

The volumes reporting the results of the expedition were published in 1864. The separate tomes concerning the vegetation and wildlife reports were prepared by the expedition's botanist and zoologist Gustav Radde.

== Dorpat Observatory ==
Ludwig Schwarz served as the Director of Dorpat Observatory (now Tartu Observatory) from 1872 (Note: EMWS issue (1894), p. 317: Scientific News, shows incorrectly 1874.) to 1891, succeeding Thomas Clausen who held the position from 1866 to 1872. Upon the retirement of Schwarz from the directorship on 1 September 1891 the position became the responsibility of Grigori Levitski who held it until 1908.

During his tenure in later life he conducted studies of one third of the 10,000 celestial stars visible at Tartu.

== Legacy ==
Radde's warbler, a leaf warbler bird that breeds in Siberia and winters in southeast Asia, bears a scientific name (Phylloscopus schwarzi) that commemorates Schwarz. The bird was described in 1863 by naturalist and fellow explorer Gustav Radde who served in the East Siberian Expedition of 1855 led by Schwarz.

== Gallery ==
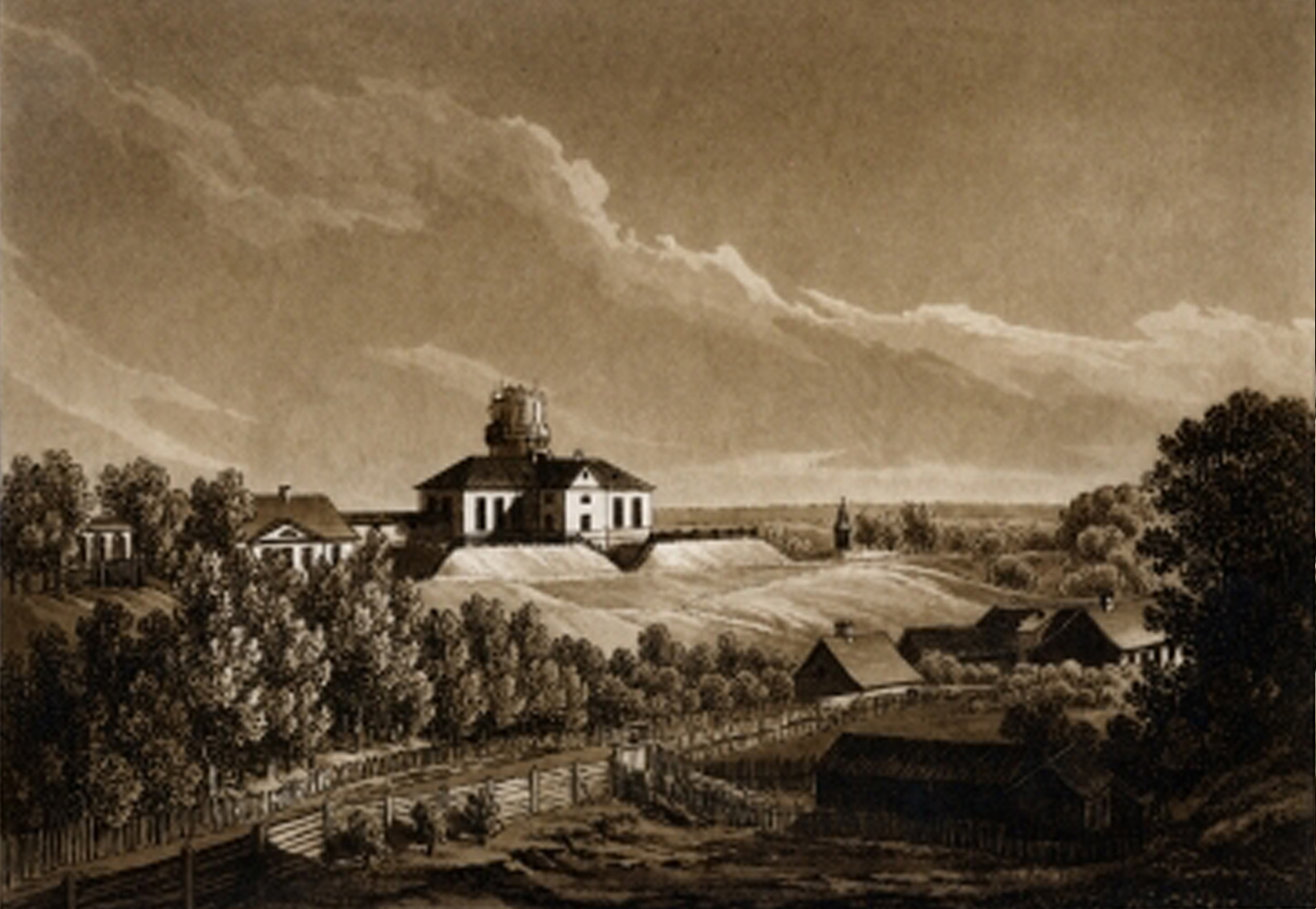
Dorpat Observatory. Painting by August Matthias Hagen, father-in-law to Schwarz.

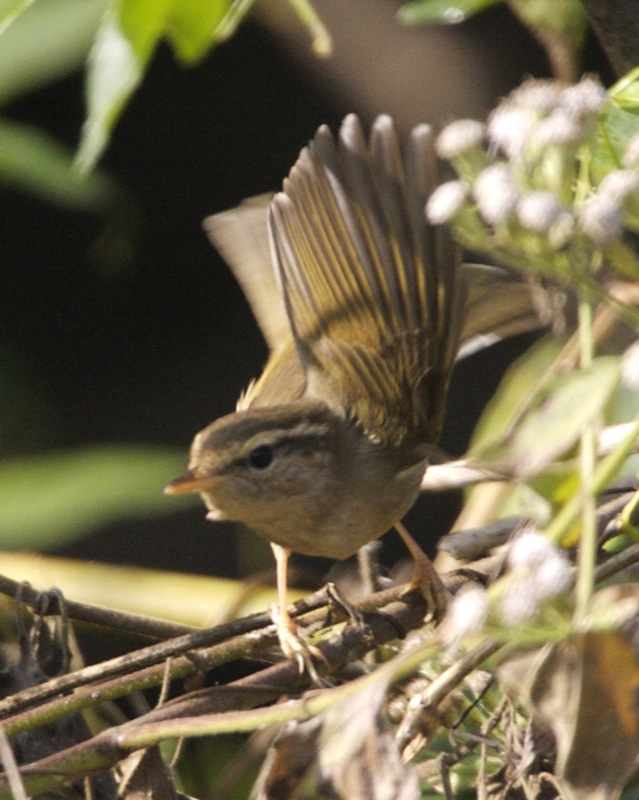
Radde's Warbler (Phylloscopus schwarzi)

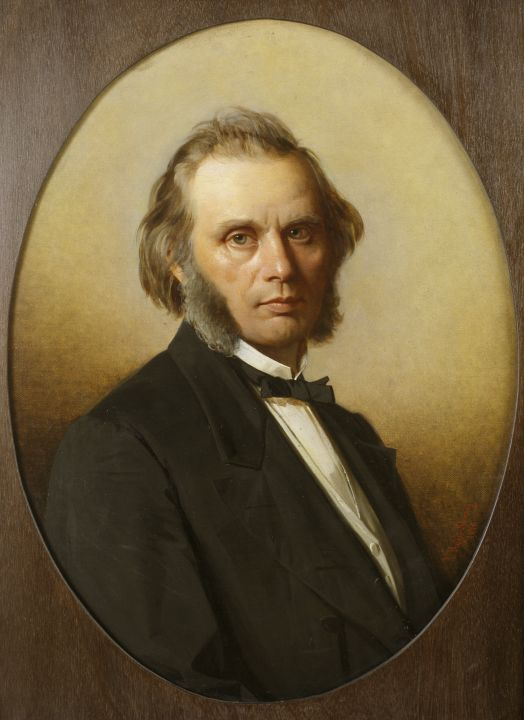
Ludwig Schwarz, 1870.
Painting by Julie Wilhelmine Hagen-Schwarz, his wife.

== Works ==
His publications include:

German:

- Schwarz, Ludwig (1889); Eine Studie auf dem Gebiete der Practischen Astronomie; Dorpat.

[English: A Study in the Field of Practical Astronomy].

- Schwarz, Ludwig (1887–1893); Beobachtungen, angestellt und herausgegeben von Ludwig Schwarz, Band 17-20; Kaiserliche Universitats-Sternwarte, Dorpat (Jurjew)

[English: Observations made and published from Ludwig Schwarz, Volumes 17-20; Imperial University Observatory].

== See also ==
- List of astronomers
- List of Russian astronomers and astrophysicists
- List of Russian explorers
- History of Siberia
- Russian conquest of Siberia

== Citations ==
Academic offices
Preceded by Thomas Clausen	Director of Dorpat Observatory (now Tartu Observatory); 1872–1891	Succeeded by Grigori Levitski
