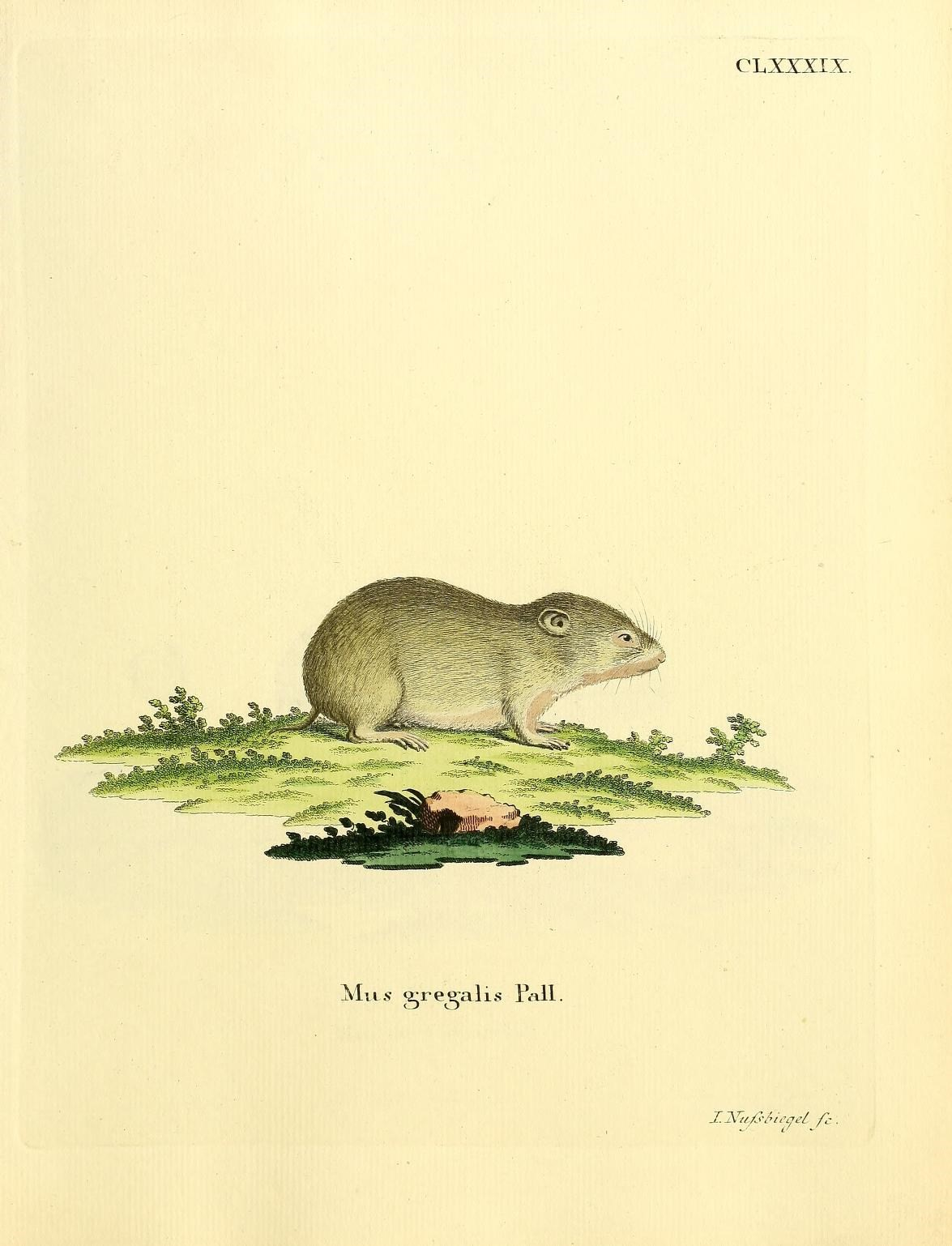

Conservation status
- Least Concern (IUCN 3.1)

Scientific classification
- Kingdom: Animalia
- Phylum: Chordata
- Class: Mammalia
- Infraclass: Placentalia
- Order: Rodentia
- Family: Cricetidae
- Subfamily: Arvicolinae
- Genus: Stenocranius
- Species: S. gregalis

Binomial name
- Stenocranius gregalis (Pallas, 1779)
- Narrow-headed vole range

Synonyms
- Lasiopodomys gregalis (Pallas, 1779); Microtus gregalis (Pallas, 1779); Mus gregalis Pallas, 1779

= Narrow-headed vole =

Species of rodent

The narrow-headed vole (Stenocranius gregalis) is a species of rodent in the family Cricetidae. It was previously placed in the genus Microtus, but modern listings either lump this into genus Lasiopodomys or split it out into Stenocranius. It ranges over northern and central Asia.

== Description ==
The narrow-headed vole has a head-and-body length between 89 and 122 mm (3.5 and 4.8 in) and a short tail of 21 to 32 mm (0.8 to 1.3 in). The dimensions of the skull distinguishes it from other Microtus species in China. In summer, the fur on the back is pale yellowish-buff, paler on the flanks and merging into the yellowish-grey underparts. In winter, the dorsal colour is a brighter reddish-ochre. The tail can either be a uniform yellowish-buff or can be bicoloured, dark brown above and yellowish-brown below. The upper surfaces of the hands and feet are brownish-white.

== Distribution and habitat ==
The narrow-headed vole is distributed across the tundra region of northern Asia from the White Sea to the Kolyma River. It also occurs as separate populations on the steppes of Kazakhstan, Kyrgyzstan, southwestern Siberia, the Sakha Republic, Mongolia, and northern China. Its typical habitat is grassy plains, semi-deserts, open grassy areas in forests, alpine meadows and water meadows at altitudes of up to 4,000 metres (13,000 ft).

During the colder phases of the Pleistocene glaciations, the narrow-headed vole's range was contiguous and extended into most of Europe. It retreated into the Carpathians, Urals, and Asia during the warmer interglacials. The Carpathian population was highly divergent genetically from Asian narrow-headed voles and became extinct in the Late Copper Age, during the Middle Holocene. In the Urals, the narrow-headed vole disappeared in the Late Holocene.

== Behaviour ==
The narrow-headed vole lives in a complex system of tunnels that run up to 25 cm (10 in) beneath the ground surface. This has multiple entrances and several nesting chambers. The narrow head of this species may have evolved to make it easier for it to squeeze through narrow gaps and crevices in frozen ground. It is mainly active at dusk and by night, but also emerges from its burrow to forage during the day. It feeds on grasses, legumes and other underground and above-ground plant material. Breeding takes place in the warmer months, with about five litters averaging eight offspring being produced annually.

This vole, along with Alexandromys middendorffi, is one of the primary preys of the Arctic fox on the Yamal Peninsula.

== Status ==
The narrow-headed vole has a very extensive range and although populations fluctuate, no particular threats have been identified with this species and overall the population seems stable. The International Union for Conservation of Nature has assessed its conservation status as being of "least concern".

== Literature ==
- Lissovsky, A.A.; Obolenskaya E.V.; Petrova T.V. (2013). "Morphological and genetic variation of narrow-headed voles Lasiopodomys gregalis from South-East Transbaikalia". Russian Journal of Theriology. 12 (2): 83–90. doi:10.15298/rusjtheriol.12.2.04.
- Petrova T.V.; Zakharov E.S.; Samiya R.; Abramson N.I. (2015). "Phylogeography of the narrow-headed vole Lasiopodomys (Stenocranius) gregalis (Cricetidae, Rodentia) inferred from mitochondrial cytochrome b sequences: an echo of Pleistocene prosperity". Journal of Zoological Systematics and Evolutionary Research. 53 (2): 97–108. doi:10.1111/jzs.12082.
- Petrova T.V.; Tesakov A.S.; Kowalskaya Yu. M.; Abramson N.I. (2016). "Cryptic speciation in the narrow-headed vole Lasiopodomys (Stenocranius) gregalis (Rodentia: Cricetidae)". Zoologica Scripta. 45 (6): 618–629. doi:10.1111/zsc.12176.
