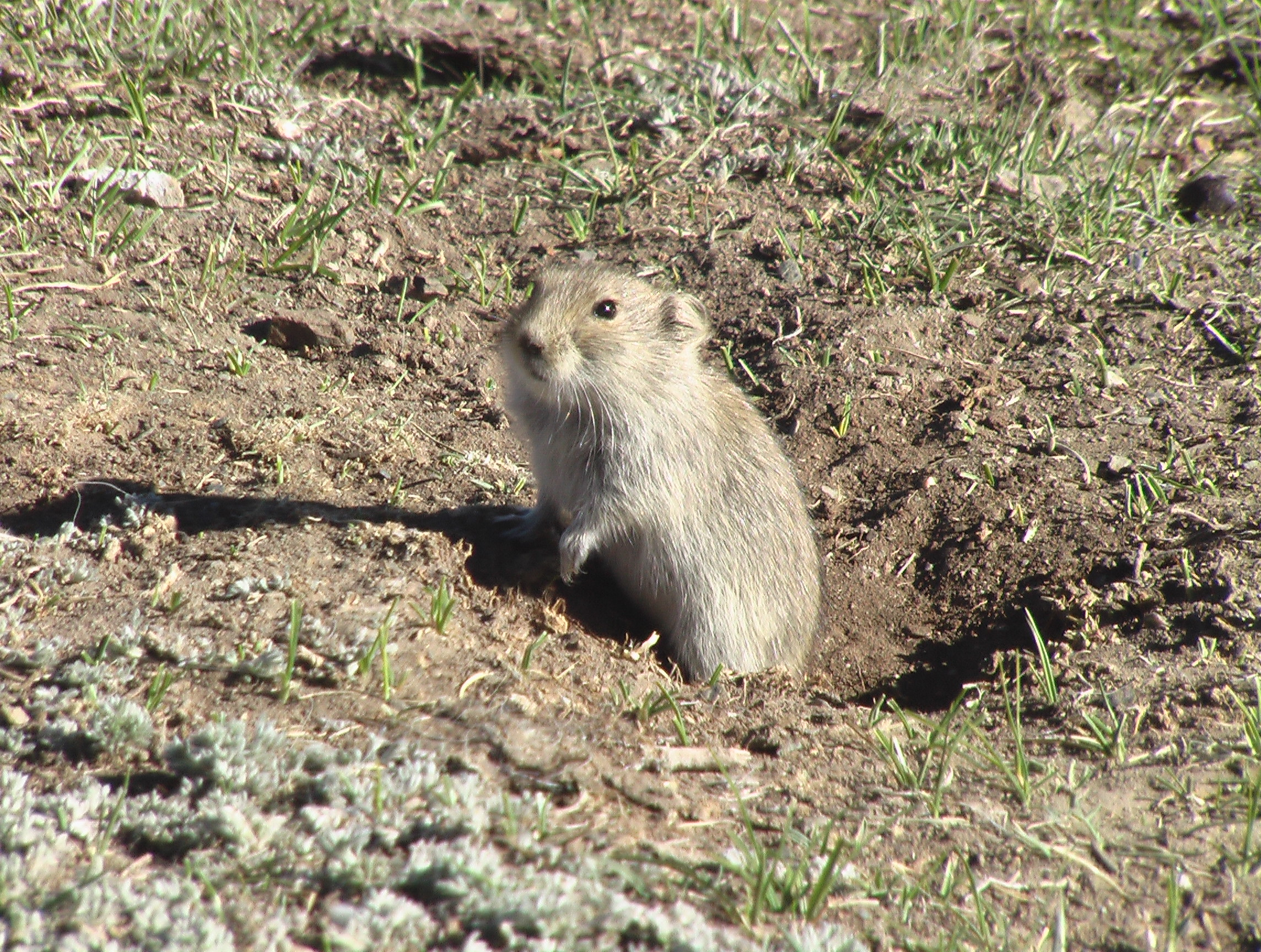
- Brandt's vole (Lasiopodomys brandtii)

Scientific classification
- Domain: Eukaryota
- Kingdom: Animalia
- Phylum: Chordata
- Class: Mammalia
- Order: Rodentia
- Family: Cricetidae
- Subfamily: Arvicolinae
- Tribe: Microtini
- Genus: Lasiopodomys; Lataste, 1887

Type species
- Arvicola brandtii Radde, 1861

Species
- Lasiopodomys brandtii Lasiopodomys mandarinus

= Lasiopodomys =

Genus of rodents

Lasiopodomys is a genus of rodent in the family Cricetidae. It contains the following species:

- Brandt's vole (Lasiopodomys brandtii)
- Mandarin vole (Lasiopodomys mandarinus)
