= August Matthias Hagen =

Baltic German painter

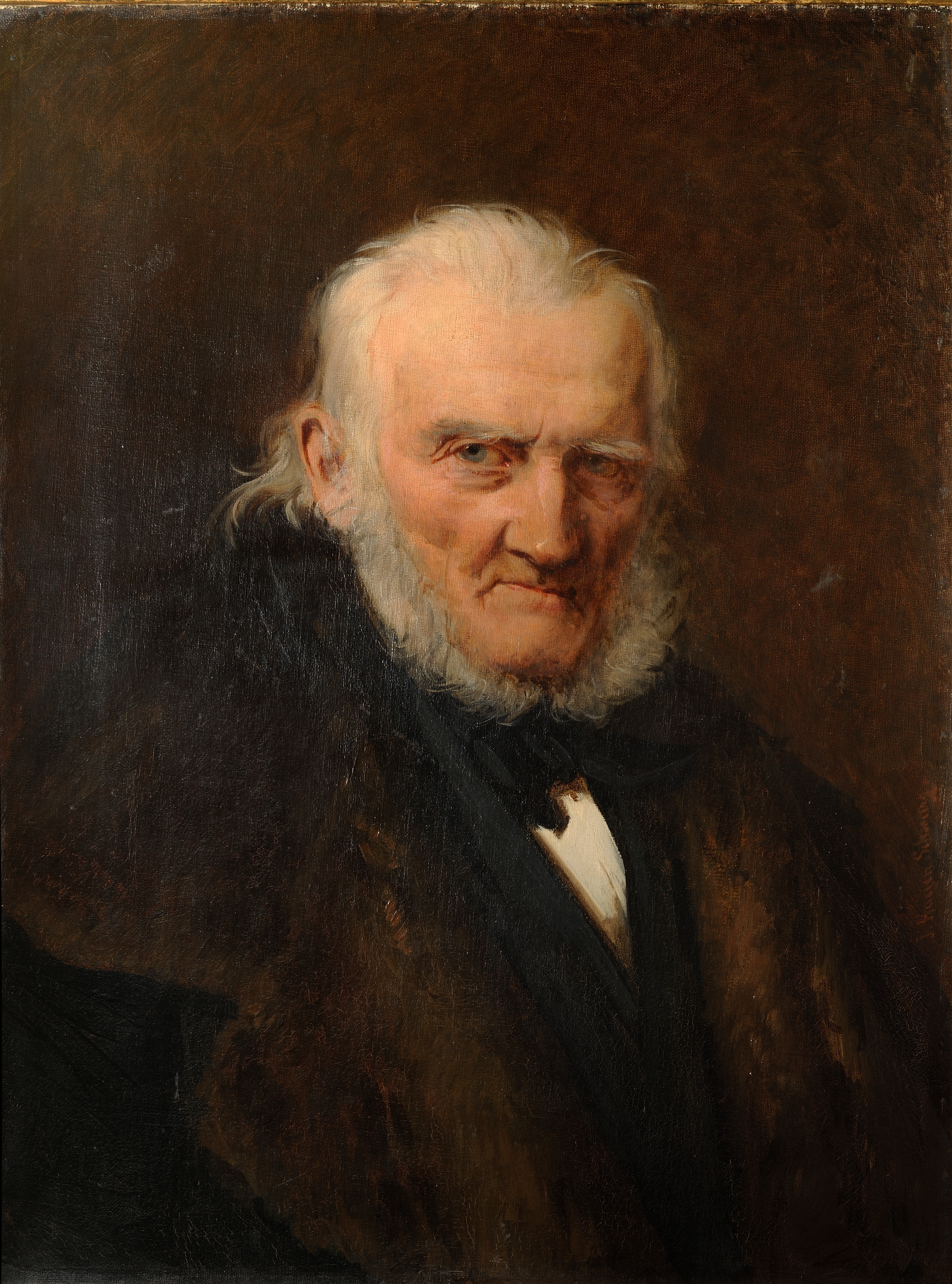
- August Matthias Hagen in 1870s (by daughter Julie Wilhelmine Hagen-Schwarz)
- Born: 23 February [O.S. 2] 1794; Wiezemhof (Vijciems), near Walk, Livonia, Russian Empire
- Died: 2 December [O.S. 20 November] 1878 (aged 84); Dorpat (Tartu), Livonia, Russian Empire
- Movement: German Romanticism

August Matthias Hagen (23 February 1794 – 2 December 1878) was a Baltic German painter and graphic artist. He specialized in landscapes and cityscapes with figures.

== Life ==
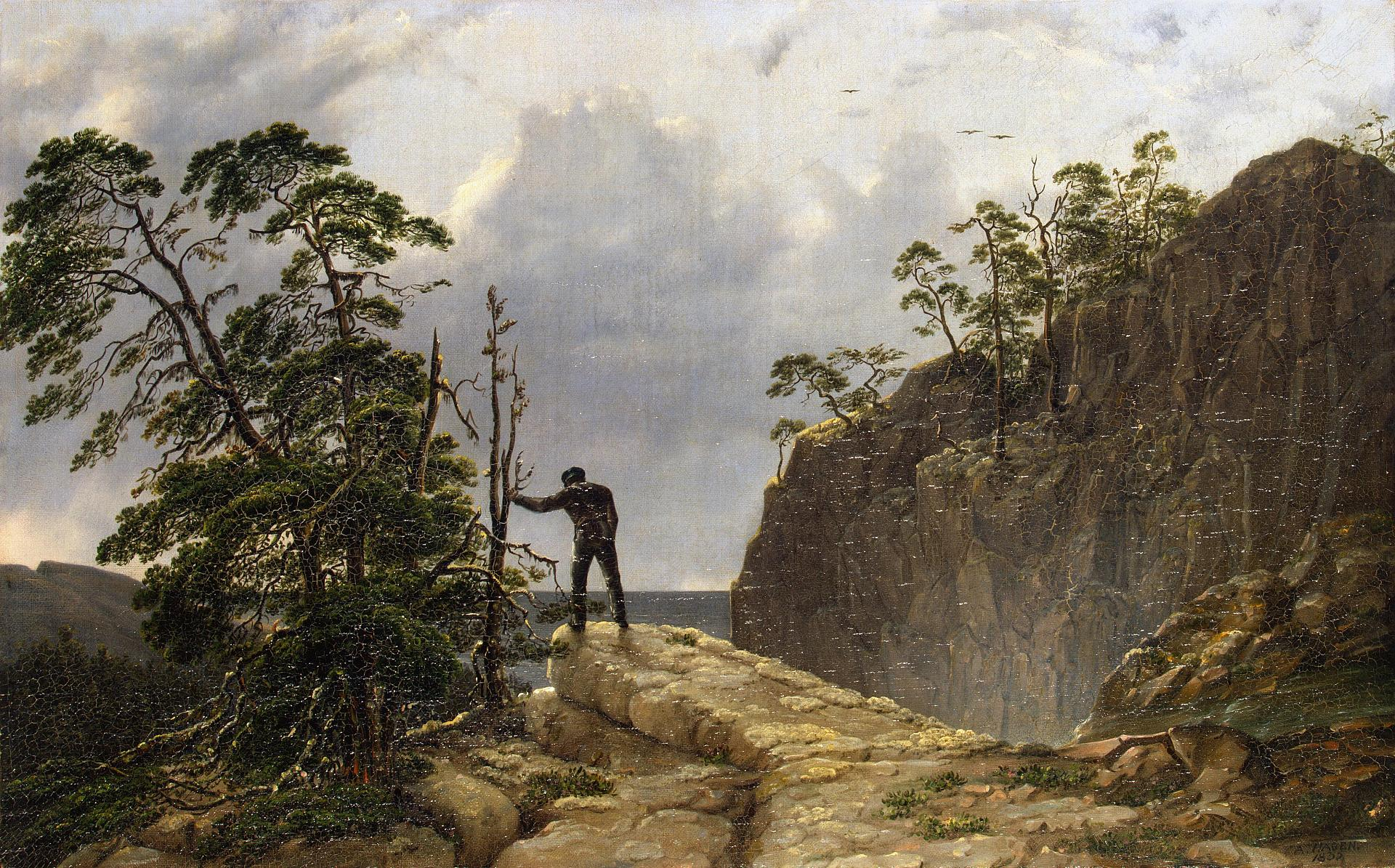
Mountains (1835)

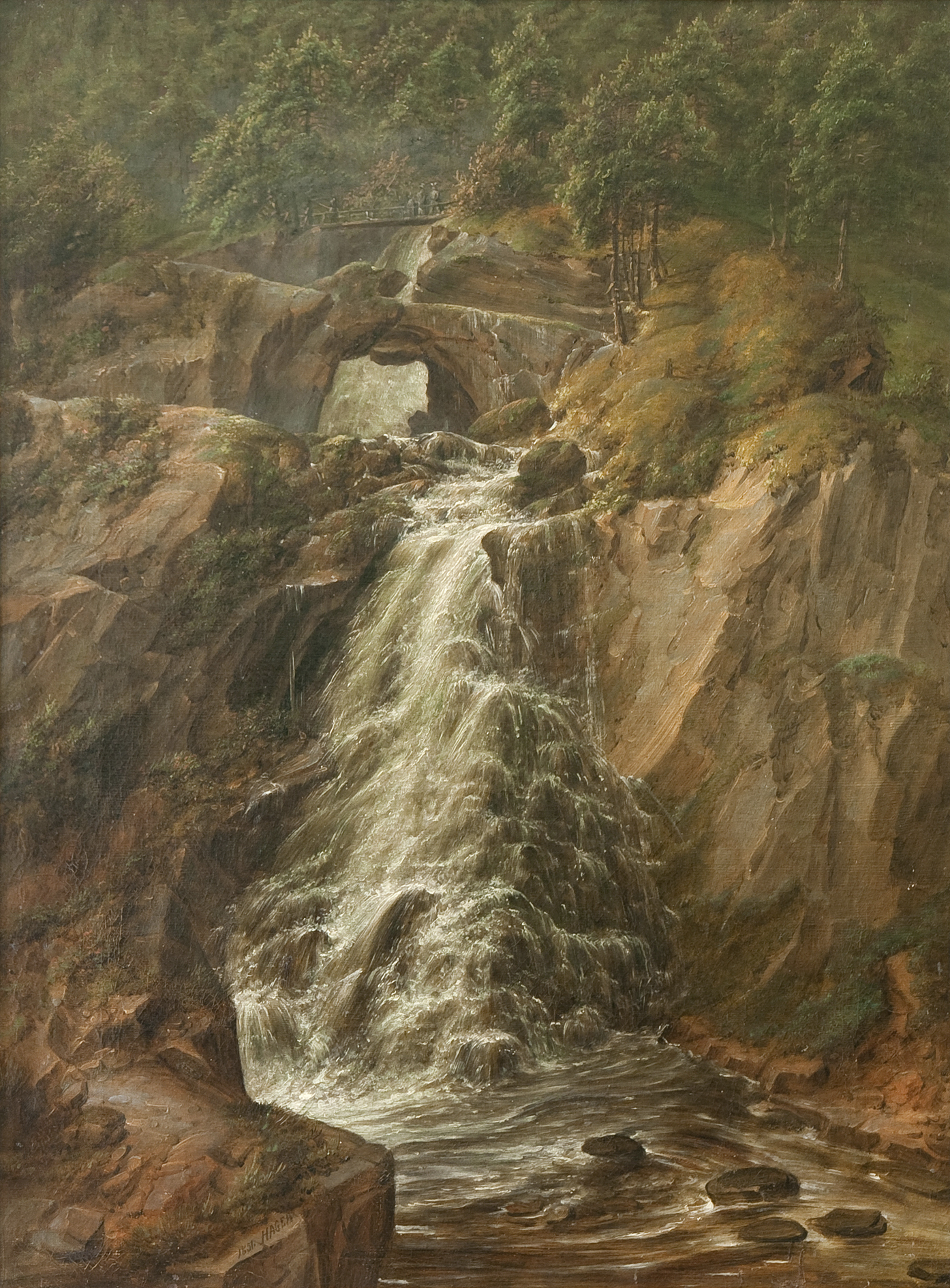
Waterfall near Salzburg (1830s?)

His father was a mill operator. Originally, he was apprenticed to be a carpenter but, while at a private boarding school, began to show some talent for drawing. Unfortunately, due to a childhood accident aggravated by a later illness, he was almost blind in one eye.

This had little effect on his artistic ability, apparently, because in 1810, on the recommendation of a local nobleman, he became a journeyman painter in Dorpat (Tartu). However, that did not turn out as planned, as he did more manual labor than learning. The following year, he began work in the graphics studio of Karl August Senff, who taught painting and engraving at the Imperial University of Dorpat.

In 1820, on the advice of Senff, he decided to go to Germany to sharpen his skills. Sailing to Lübeck, he travelled on foot to Berlin, Dresden, Prague and Vienna. He later took extended hikes through Switzerland and Italy, as far as Rome, keeping detailed diaries and making a huge number of sketches.

Four years later, after getting married in Passau, he returned to Tartu (Dorpat), where he worked as a drawing teacher at a boys' school. His best known works, a series of aquatints commemorating the anniversary of the 1802 reopening of the University of Tartu, date from this period. He then taught at a girls' school from 1829 to 1832. After that, once again taking to the road, he painted scenes throughout Estonia and on islands in the Gulf of Finland.

In 1837, following a successful exhibition in Saint Petersburg, he was designated a "free artist" by the Russian Imperial Academy of Arts and, the following year, succeeded his mentor Senff as Professor of drawing at the University of Tartu. He held that position until 1851, when he was forced to retire due to increasingly poor eyesight. Three years later he gave up painting. Not wishing to remain idle, he discovered that his sight was still good enough to take up photography and his small salon became very popular.

His daughter, Julie Wilhelmine, also became a well-known painter who married the astronomer, Ludwig Schwarz.
