= Sakhalin vole =

Conservation status
- Least Concern (IUCN 3.1)

Scientific classification
- Kingdom: Animalia
- Phylum: Chordata
- Class: Mammalia
- Order: Rodentia
- Family: Cricetidae
- Subfamily: Arvicolinae
- Genus: Alexandromys
- Species: A. sachalinensis

Binomial name
- Alexandromys sachalinensis (Vasin, 1955)

Synonyms
- Microtus sachalinensis Vasin, 1955

Species of rodent

The Sakhalin vole (Alexandromys sachalinensis) is a species of rodent in the family Cricetidae. It is found only in Russia.
