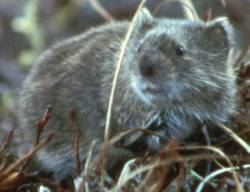
- Tundra vole, (Alexandromys oeconomus)

Scientific classification
- Kingdom: Animalia
- Phylum: Chordata
- Class: Mammalia
- Order: Rodentia
- Family: Cricetidae
- Subfamily: Arvicolinae
- Tribe: Microtini
- Genus: Alexandromys; Ognev, 1914

Type species
- Microtus pelliceus Thomas, 1911 (= Microtus fortis Büchner, 1889)

Species
- Alexandromys alpinus Alexandromys evoronensis Alexandromys fortis Alexandromys kikuchii Alexandromys limnophilus Alexandromys maximowiczii Alexandromys middendorffi Alexandromys mongolicus Alexandromys montebelli Alexandromys mujanensis Alexandromys oeconomus Alexandromys sachalinensis Alexandromys shantaricus

= Alexandromys =

Genus of rodents

Alexandromys is a genus of voles in the subfamily Arvicolinae, formerly a subgenus of the genus Microtus. Species in this genus are:

- Alpine vole (Alexandromys alpinus) split off from A. mongolicus
- Evorsk vole (Alexandromys evoronensis)
- Reed vole (Alexandromys fortis)
- Taiwan vole (Alexandromys kikuchii)
- Lacustrine vole (Alexandromys limnophilus)
- Maximowicz's vole (Alexandromys maximowiczii)
- Middendorff's vole (Alexandromys middendorffi)
- Mongolian vole (Alexandromys mongolicus)
- Japanese grass vole (Alexandromys montebelli)
- Muya Valley vole (Alexandromys mujanensis)
- Tundra vole or root vole (Alexandromys oeconomus)
- Sakhalin vole (Alexandromys sachalinensis)
- Shantar vole (Alexandromys shantaricus) split off from A. maximowiczii
