= Muya Valley vole =

Muisk vole

Conservation status
- Data Deficient (IUCN 3.1)

Scientific classification
- Kingdom: Animalia
- Phylum: Chordata
- Class: Mammalia
- Order: Rodentia
- Family: Cricetidae
- Subfamily: Arvicolinae
- Genus: Alexandromys
- Species: A. mujanensis

Binomial name
- Alexandromys mujanensis (Orlov & Kovalskaya, 1978)

Synonyms
- Microtus mujanensis Orlov & Kovalskaya, 1978

Species of rodent

The Muya Valley vole or Muisk vole (Alexandromys mujanensis) is a species of rodent in the family Cricetidae. It is found only in Russia.
