= Middendorff's vole =

Conservation status
- Least Concern (IUCN 3.1)

Scientific classification
- Kingdom: Animalia
- Phylum: Chordata
- Class: Mammalia
- Order: Rodentia
- Family: Cricetidae
- Subfamily: Arvicolinae
- Genus: Alexandromys
- Species: A. middendorffi

Binomial name
- Alexandromys middendorffi (Poliakov, 1881)

Synonyms
- Arvicola middendorfii Poljakov, 1881; Microtus middendorffi (Poliakov, 1881) [orth. error]; Microtus middendorffii (Poljakov, 1881); hyperboreus Vinogradov, 1934; obscurus (Middendorff, 1853); ryphaeus Heptner, 1948; swerevi Skalon, 1935; tasensis Skalon, 1935; uralensis Skalon, 1935

Species of rodent

Middendorff's vole (Alexandromys middendorffi) is a species of rodent in the family Cricetidae. It is found only in Russia, most commonly north Siberia.

The common name commemorates Alexander Theodor von Middendorff (1815–1894), a German–Russian naturalist who traveled extensively in Siberia. It is also known as the north Siberian vole or Altai vole.

This vole, along with Stenocranius gregalis, is one of the primary preys of the Arctic fox on the Yamal Peninsula.
