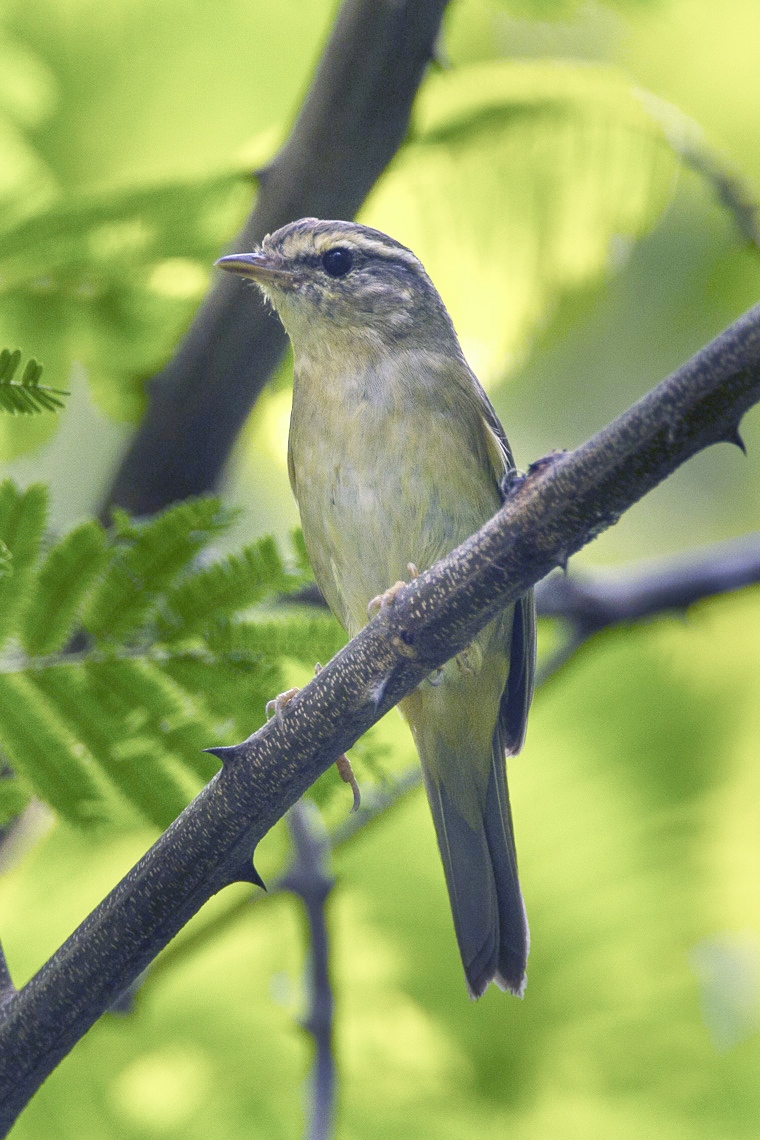
- In Thailand

Conservation status
- Least Concern (IUCN 3.1)

Scientific classification
- Kingdom: Animalia
- Phylum: Chordata
- Class: Aves
- Order: Passeriformes
- Family: Phylloscopidae
- Genus: Phylloscopus
- Species: P. schwarzi

Binomial name
- Phylloscopus schwarzi (Radde, 1863)
- Range of P. schwarzi Breeding Passage Non-breeding

= Radde's warbler =

Species of passerine bird

Radde's warbler (Phylloscopus schwarzi) is a leaf warbler which breeds in Siberia. This warbler is strongly migratory and winters in Southeast Asia. The genus name Phylloscopus is from Ancient Greek phullon, "leaf", and skopos, "seeker" (from skopeo, "to watch"). The specific schwarzi commemorates German astronomer Ludwig Schwarz (1822–1894).

== Description ==
This is a warbler similar in size to a willow warbler. The adult has an unstreaked brown back and buff underparts. There is a very long prominent whitish supercilium, and the pointed bill is thicker than that of the similar dusky warbler. The legs are paler than those of the dusky warbler, and the feet look large, reflecting the more terrestrial lifestyle of this warbler. The sexes are identical, as with most warblers, but young birds are yellower below. The call is a soft chick.

== Distribution and habitat ==
Radde's warbler breeds in southern parts of Central and Eastern Siberia as far east as Korea and Manchuria. It is a migratory species and spends the winter in Bangladesh, Cambodia, Laos, Myanmar and Thailand. In its breeding range, Radde's warbler is found in open deciduous woodlands with some undergrowth and bushy woodland margins, often near water. In its winter quarters it occupies the fringes of forests, thick scrub and bushy places near woodland. Like most Old World warblers, this small passerine bird is insectivorous.

== Breeding ==
The nest is built low in a bush and about five eggs are laid. They have a greyish background colour mottled and streaked with fine markings of brownish-olive, scattered evenly over the surface, which nearly obscure the base colour. They are approximately 17 by 13 millimetres (0.67 by 0.51 in).

This small warbler is prone to vagrancy as far as western Europe in October, wandering a distance of 3,000 km from its breeding grounds. It has been recorded from the Copeland Bird Observatory in County Down, Northern Ireland where it was first recorded for Northern Ireland in 2008. It has also occurred as an accidental in Heligoland.
