= Punuk Islands =

Coordinates: 63°04′48″N 168°49′05″W

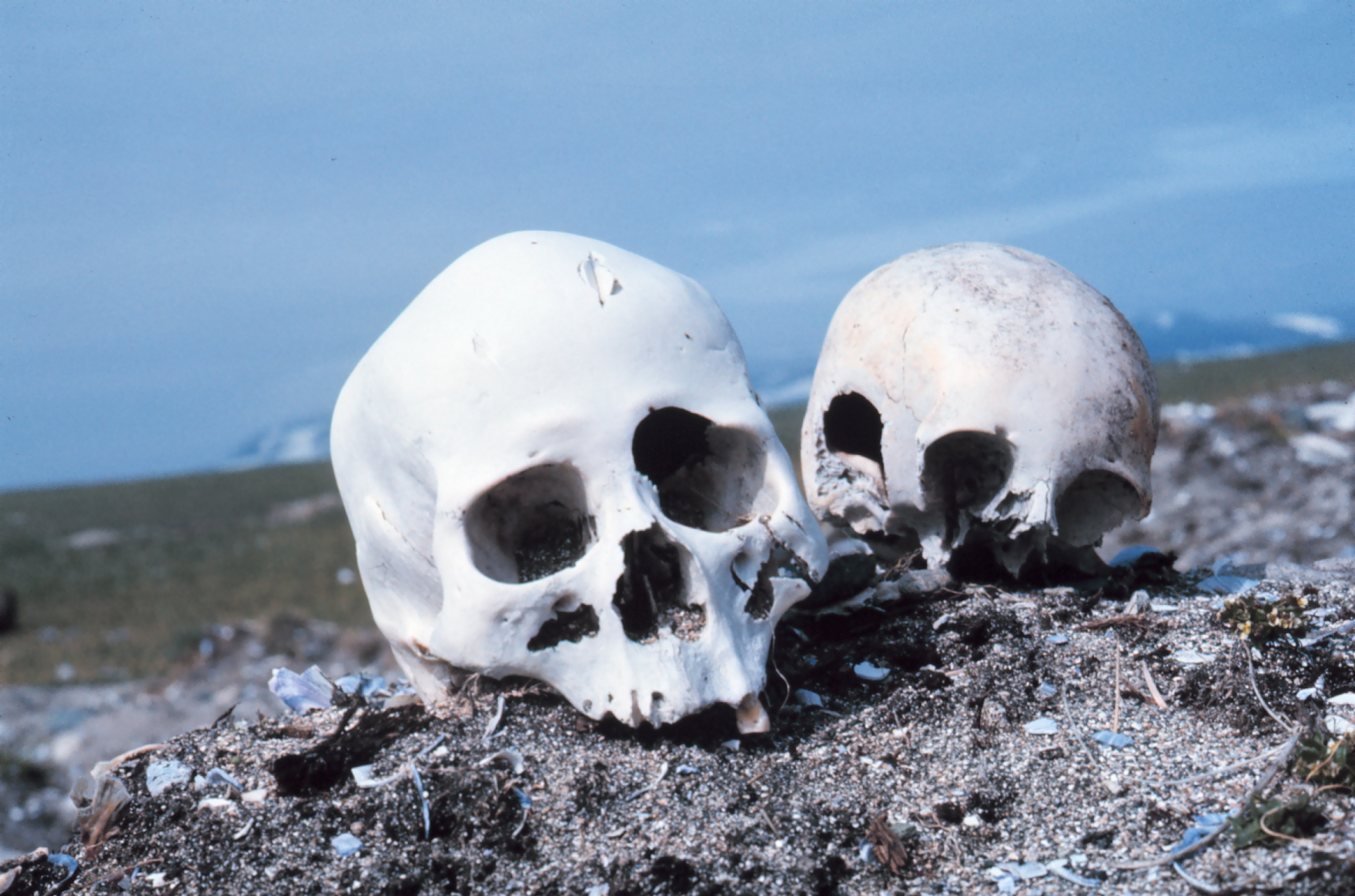
Photo, taken in 1977, of skulls washed up on the beach on the Punuk Islands. The photographer noted that this was a common occurrence there.

The Punuk Islands (Russian: Пунукские острова) are a chain of three small islets in the Bering Sea off the eastern end of St. Lawrence Island. They are located 8.5 km to the southeast of Cape Apavawook and 18 km to the southwest of Niyghapak Point.

These islands were drawn on the map with their Siberian Yupik name, which was obtained in 1849 by Capt. M. D. Tebenkov, of the Imperial Russian Navy. They are also known by the names "Pinik Islands" and "Poongook Islands".

The Punuk Islands are a natural habitat for walruses and seabirds. The Tundra Voles found on the island belong to an endemic subspecies (Microtus oeconomus punukensis).

The Okvik site, a significant Punuk culture archaeological site, was discovered on the Punuk Islands by Otto W. Geist in 1931. Geist and Ivar Skarland excavated the site in 1934, which yielded fossilized walrus ivory artifacts, many of which are now in the collection of the University of Alaska.
