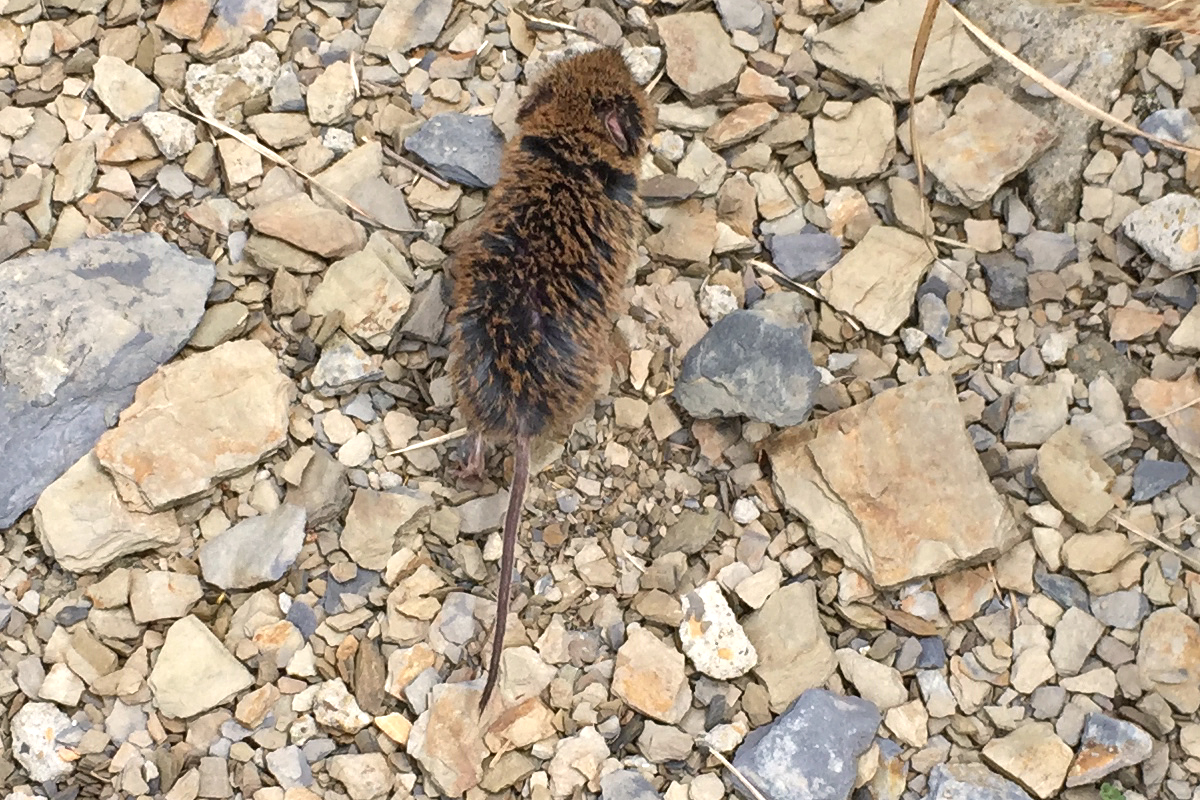

Conservation status
- Least Concern (IUCN 3.1)

Scientific classification
- Kingdom: Animalia
- Phylum: Chordata
- Class: Mammalia
- Order: Rodentia
- Family: Cricetidae
- Subfamily: Arvicolinae
- Genus: Alexandromys
- Species: A. kikuchii

Binomial name
- Alexandromys kikuchii (Kuroda, 1920)

Synonyms
- Microtus kikuchii Kuroda, 1920; Volemys kikuchii (Kuroda, 1920)

= Taiwan vole =

Species of rodent

The Taiwan vole (Alexandromys kikuchii) is a species of rodent in the family Cricetidae. It is endemic to Taiwan. This species is herbivorous with a preference for the Yushan cane.
