= Evorsk vole =

Conservation status
- Data Deficient (IUCN 3.1)

Scientific classification
- Kingdom: Animalia
- Phylum: Chordata
- Class: Mammalia
- Order: Rodentia
- Family: Cricetidae
- Subfamily: Arvicolinae
- Genus: Alexandromys
- Species: A. evoronensis

Binomial name
- Alexandromys evoronensis (Kovalskaya & Sokolov, 1980)

Synonyms
- Microtus evoronensis Kovalskaya & Sokolov, 1980

Species of rodent

The Evorsk vole (Alexandromys evoronensis) is a species of rodent in the family Cricetidae. It is found only in Russia. It is a stout rodent with short ears, legs and tails. This species lives in grassy areas where it eats green vegetation such as grasses and sedges in summer, and grains, seeds, roots and bark at other times.
