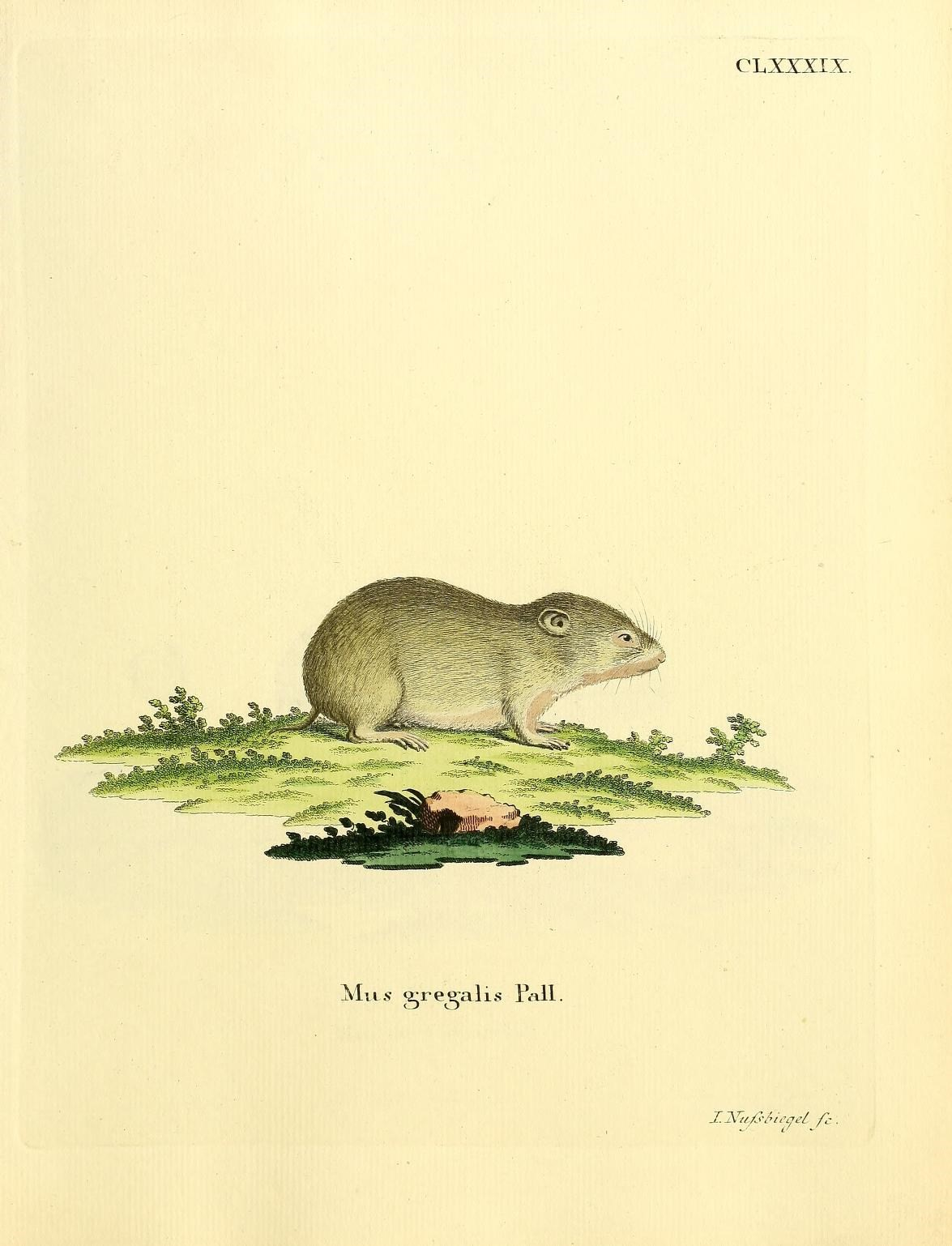
- Narrow-headed vole

Scientific classification
- Kingdom: Animalia
- Phylum: Chordata
- Class: Mammalia
- Order: Rodentia
- Family: Cricetidae
- Subfamily: Arvicolinae
- Tribe: Microtini
- Genus: Stenocranius; Kastschenko, 1901

Type species
- Arvicola slowzowi Poljakov, 1881 (= Mus gregalis Pallas, 1779

Species
- Stenocranius gregalis Stenocranius raddei

= Stenocranius =

Genus of rodents

Stenocranius is a genus of rodent in the family Cricetidae. It contains the following species:

- Narrow-headed vole (Stenocranius gregalis)
- Radde's vole (Stenocranius raddei)
- Stenocranius anglicus (fossil Narrow-headed vole from Europe)
