= Julie Wilhelmine Hagen-Schwarz =

Estonian artist (1824–1902)

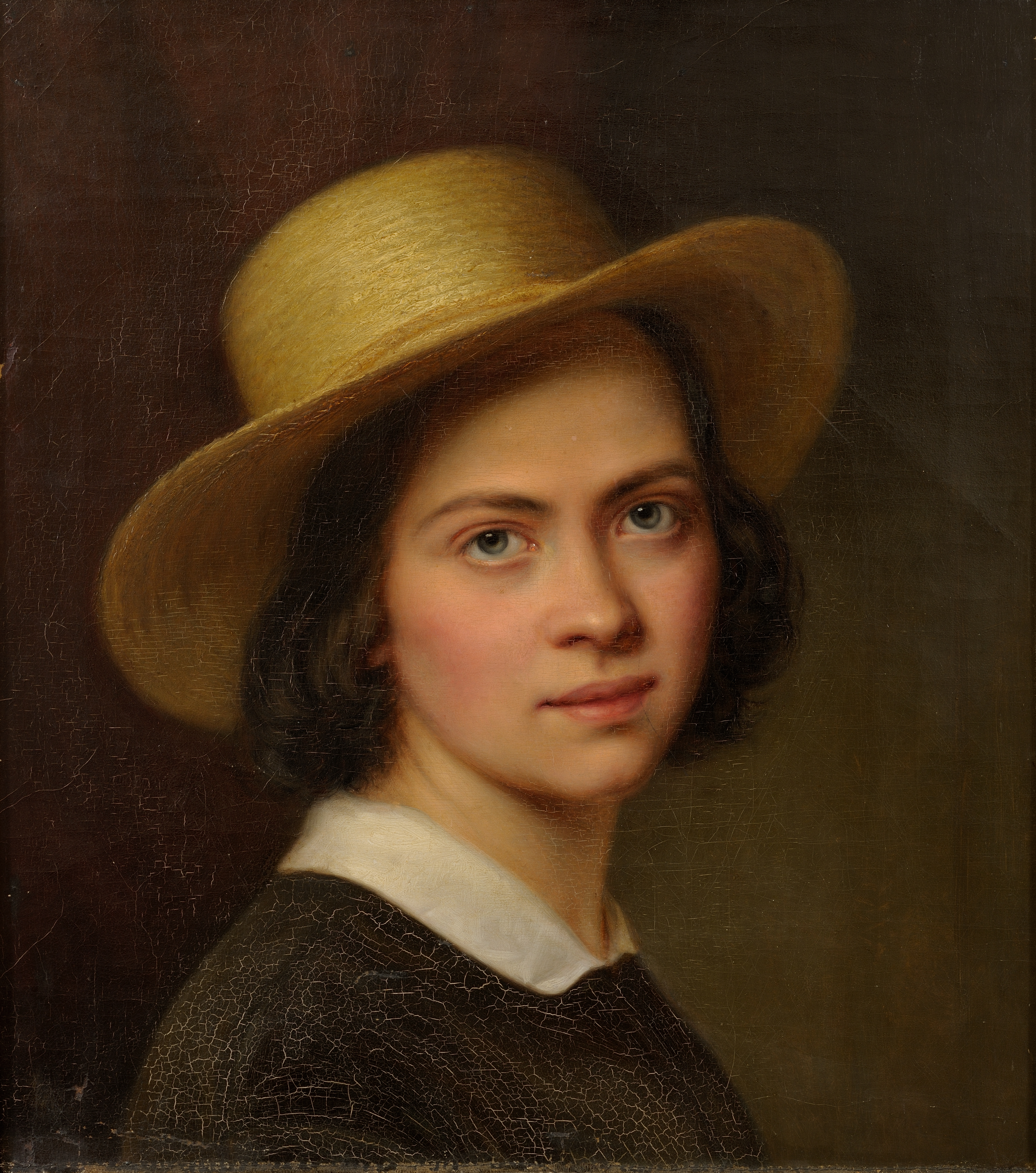
- Self-portrait (before 1870)
- Born: 27 October [O.S. 5] 1824; Klein-Wrangelshof manor, Klein-Wrangelshof, Kreis Wolmar, Governorate of Livonia, Russian Empire (in present-day Mazbrenguļi, Kocēni Municipality, Latvia)
- Died: 20 October [O.S. 7] 1902 (aged 77); Dorpat, Kreis Dorpat, Governorate of Livonia, Russian Empire (present-day Tartu, Tartu County, Estonia)
- Known for: Portrait painting
- Spouse: Peter Carl Ludwig Schwarz

Julie Wilhelmine Hagen-Schwarz (27 October [O.S. 5] 1824 – 20 October [O.S. 7] 1902) was a Baltic German painter, primarily of portraits.

== Biography ==
She was the daughter of the painter August Matthias Hagen; born while her parents were on a painting excursion. She displayed an early interest in drawing, so her father wasted no time in giving her lessons. After graduating from the public schools, she enrolled at the University of Dorpat (now University of Tartu), where she was soon attracted to portrait painting.

After graduating, she received a grant to study in Germany. She began with Friedrich Gonne in Dresden, then went to Munich, obtaining a position in the workshops of Moritz Rugendas. Three years later, she returned to Tartu and received another grant from Tsar Nicholas I to study in Italy. This time, she was accompanied by her father, who hoped that the Italian climate would help his failing eyesight.

In 1854 she returned home, already a well-known artist due to her participation in several exhibits throughout Europe. Soon after, she married the astronomer Ludwig Schwarz, who later became Director of the local observatory. Her honeymoon consisted of an expedition to Southeast Siberia, covering 600 versts, where her husband was part of a team exploring mineral resources and preparing a detailed map on behalf of the Russian Geographical Society. As might be expected, she took the opportunity to sketch everything of interest.

In 1858, she became the first Russian woman elected to the Imperial Academy of Arts. After that, she spent much of her time in Saint Petersburg, participating in all the local and national exhibitions. Overall, she produced more than 700 portraits.

== Selected paintings ==
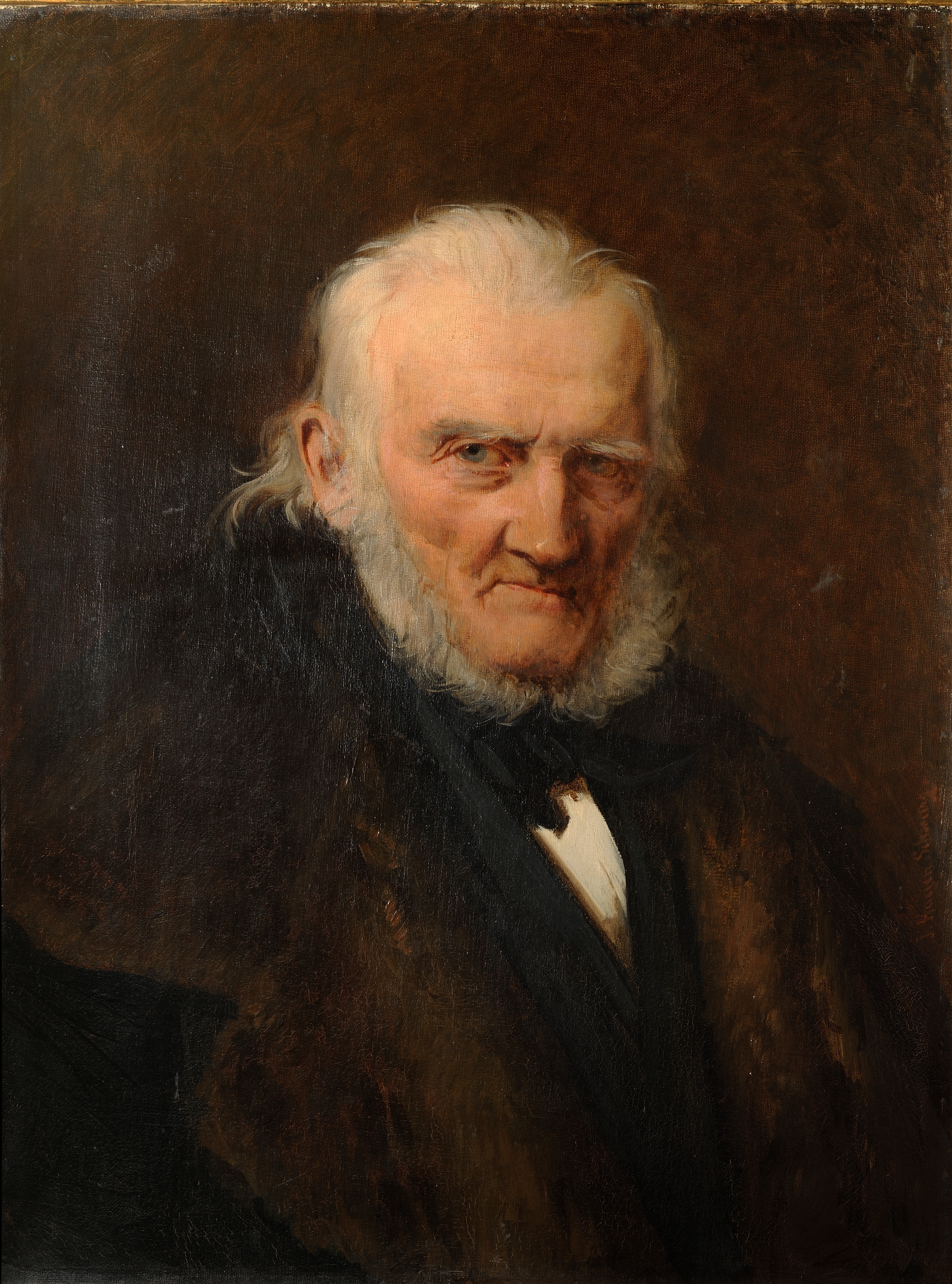
August Matthias Hagen, the painter's father, 1870s

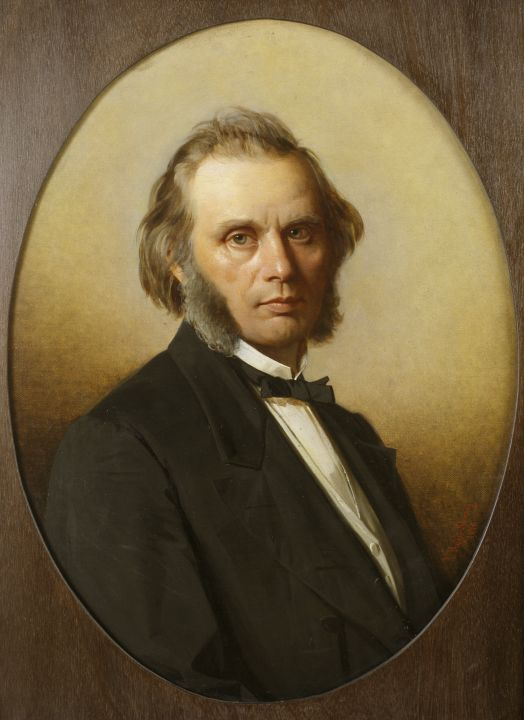
Portrait of her husband (1870)

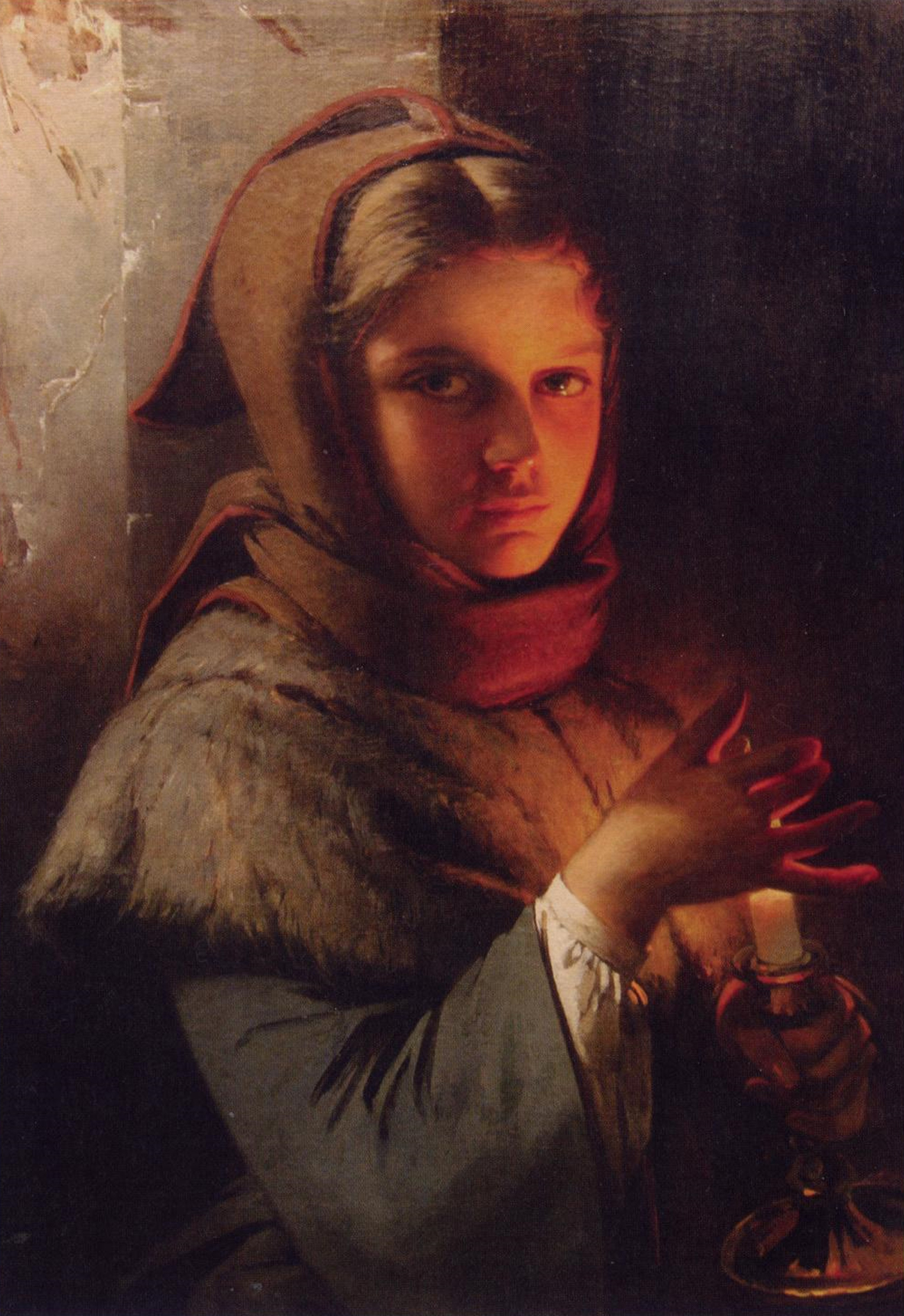
Portrait of a Young Girl (1870s)

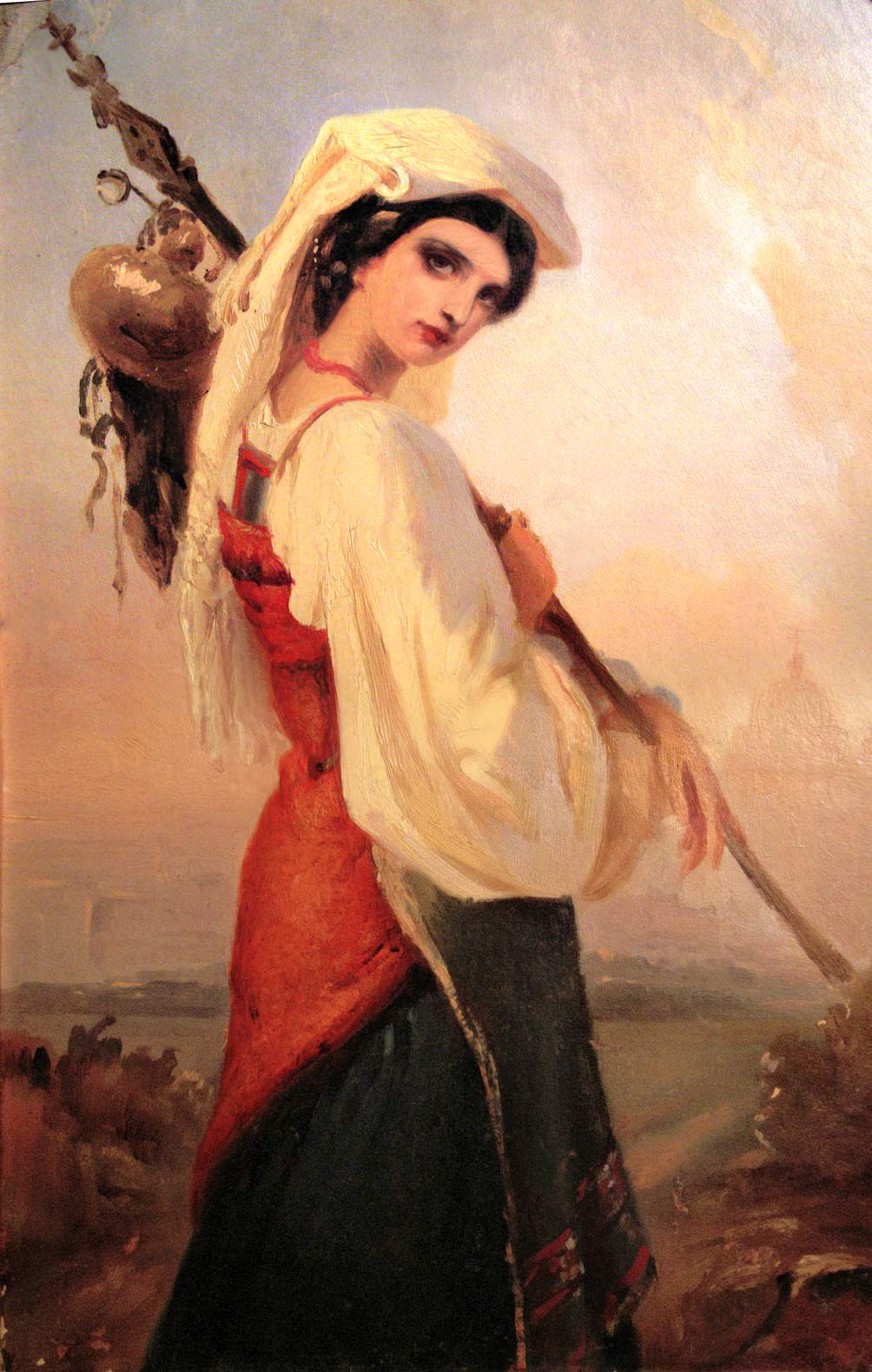
Italian Maiden on her Way to Rome (c.1850)

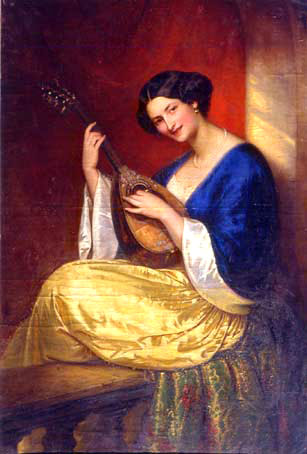
Mandolin Player (1851)

== See also ==
- List of German women artists
