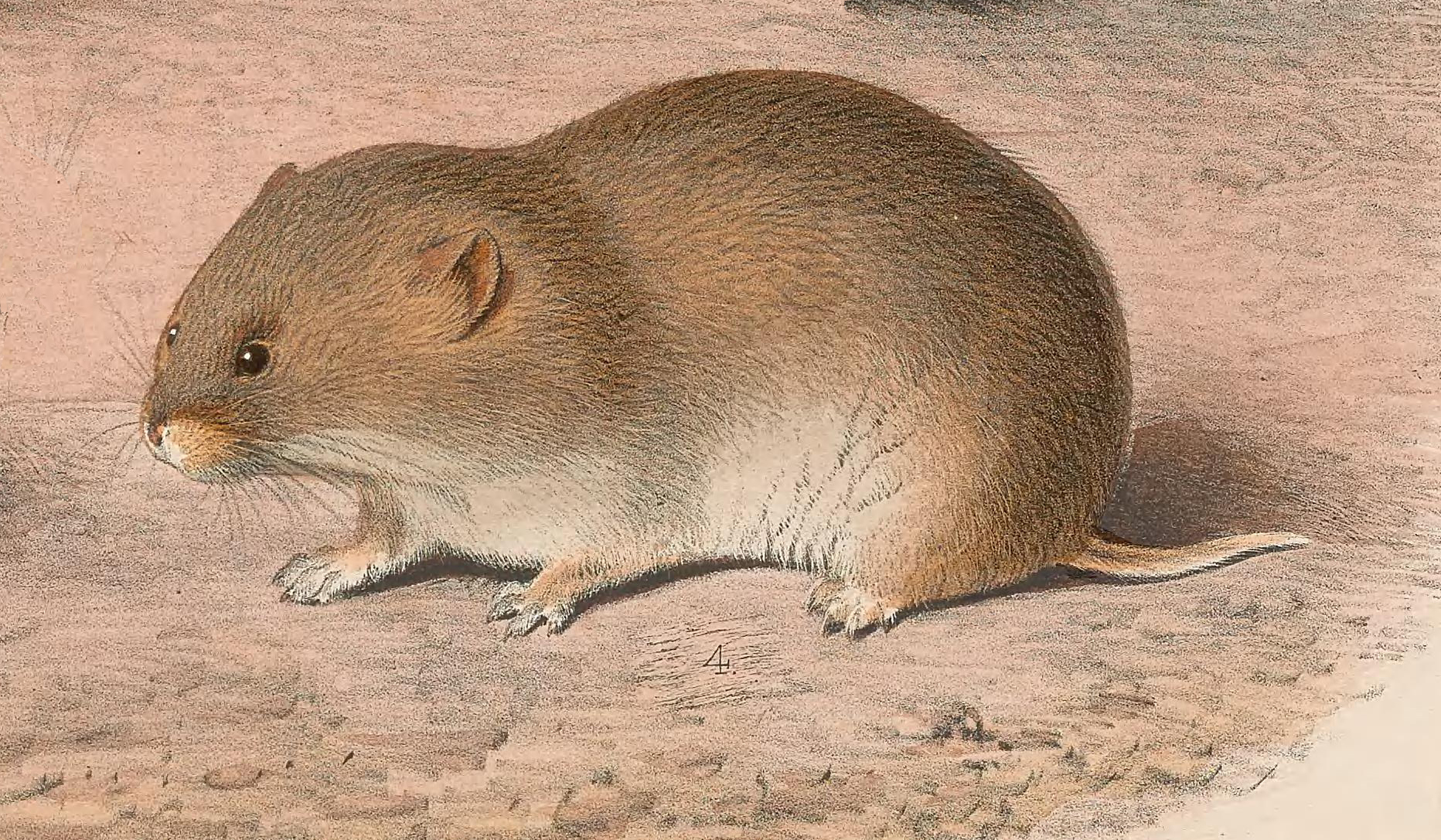

Conservation status
- Least Concern (IUCN 3.1)

Scientific classification
- Kingdom: Animalia
- Phylum: Chordata
- Class: Mammalia
- Order: Rodentia
- Family: Cricetidae
- Subfamily: Arvicolinae
- Genus: Alexandromys
- Species: A. limnophilus

Binomial name
- Alexandromys limnophilus (Büchner, 1889)

Synonyms
- Microtus limnophilus Büchner, 1889

= Lacustrine vole =

Species of rodent

The lacustrine vole (Alexandromys limnophilus) is a species of rodent in the family Cricetidae. It is found in China and Mongolia.
