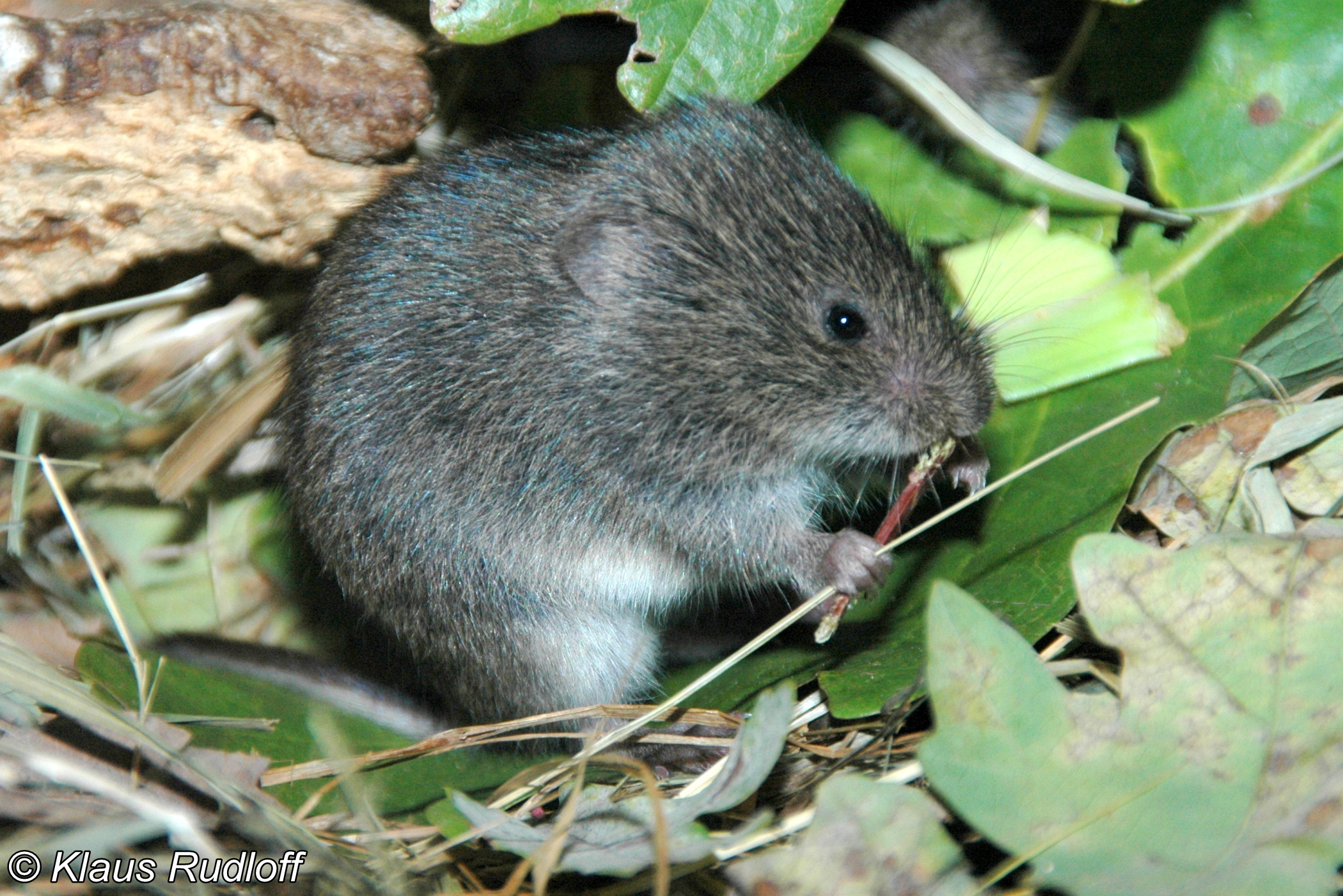

Conservation status
- Least Concern (IUCN 3.1)

Scientific classification
- Kingdom: Animalia
- Phylum: Chordata
- Class: Mammalia
- Order: Rodentia
- Family: Cricetidae
- Subfamily: Arvicolinae
- Genus: Alexandromys
- Species: A. fortis

Binomial name
- Alexandromys fortis (Büchner, 1889)
External image
- Distribution range

Synonyms
- Microtis fortis Büchner, 1889; Microtus michnoi Kastschenko, 1910; Microtus pelliceus Thomas, 1911; Microtus uliginosus James & Johnson, 1955

= Reed vole =

Species of rodent

The reed vole or Yangtze vole (Alexandromys fortis) is a species of vole. It is found in northern and central Eurasia, including northern China and the Korean Peninsula. This species is somewhat larger and longer-tailed than most other voles.

== Description ==
The reed vole is one of the largest voles in the genus Alexandromys. Adults grow to a head-and-body length of 120 to 139 mm (4.7 to 5.5 in) with a tail of 48 to 67 mm (1.9 to 2.6 in). The fur on the back is dark tawny-brown and the flanks are buffish brown, blending gradually into the greyish underparts. The upper side of the feet are light brown and the tail is bicoloured, the upper side being dark brown and the underside whitish. Males are considerably larger than females.

== Distribution ==
The reed vole is native to eastern Asia. Its range includes the Trans-Baikal region of Russia, the Amur River Basin, northeastern Mongolia, eastern China and North and South Korea. Its typical habitat is steppe and forest steppe where it is found near lakes and watercourses, among coarse vegetation and in wet meadows and marshes. It may move into adjoining agricultural or vacant land when its habitat is flooded as happens in spring and summer, migrating inland for up to 20 kilometres (12 mi) and returning to its waterside haunts when the flooding subsides. Its maximum altitude is about 2,000 m (6,600 ft) above sea level. The population varies greatly per year, depending on conditions such as precipitation and harsh winters.

== Behaviour ==
The reed vole is active both by day and night. It moves rather slowly on land but is an excellent swimmer. In well-drained soil, it digs fairly complex burrows with side passages, nesting chambers, storage rooms and multiple entrances; its passages can extend to 120–150 cm (1.3–1.6 yd). In particularly wet environments the burrows may be shallow or mere ruts on the surface of the ground. Close to lakes and watercourses, spherical nests up to 30 cm (12 in) in diameter are sometimes built hidden in thick vegetation, several nests sometimes occurring close to each other with well-worn paths between them. In the spring and summer, reed voles mainly eat shoots and leaves, as well as the stems of grasses. In the autumn they gather grain and pieces of grass and store them in their burrows and at this time of year they also feed on bark, roots and the pith of reeds but leaves seem to be their favourite food. A vole may consume its own body weight in food every day.

The voles live in groups consisting of one dominant male, multiple females and their offspring. They act aggressively towards their own species of other groups.

Breeding takes place between April and November. In favourable conditions there may be six litters during the season, each consisting of about five offspring. The gestation period is about twenty days with females becoming sexually mature by about four months and males at a slightly older age. Females are fertile at as little as 17 days after the previous litter, allowing them to have new litters 12 times a year.

== Status ==
The reed vole is a common species over much of its wide range and no particular threats have been identified, so the International Union for Conservation of Nature has assessed its conservation status as being of "least concern".

== Relationship with humans ==
After flooding of the Yangtze River in late June 2007, approximately 2 billion reed voles were displaced from the islands of China's Dongting Lake when water was released from the Three Gorges Dam to control the excess. The rodents invaded surrounding communities, damaging crops and dikes and forcing the government to construct walls and ditches to control the population. In large numbers when migrating inland, the voles cause harm to crops and can spread diseases. Their burrowing also destroys levees.

The vole is a known carrier of infectious viruses and bacteria Coxiella burnetii, Yersinia pestis, hantavirus, and Leptospira spp.

== See also ==
- 2007 vole plague in Castile and León – plague of the common vole
