= Gustav Radde =

German naturalist and explorer (1831–1903)

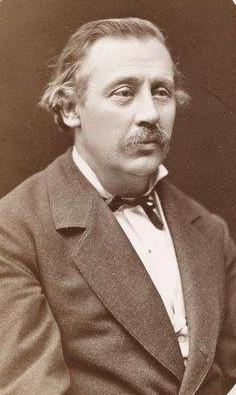
- Gustav Radde as a middle-aged man, 1883
- Born: 27 November 1831; Danzig, Prussia
- Died: 16 March 1903 (aged 71); Tbilisi (Tiflis), Georgia Russian Empire
- Awards: Patron's Medal (1889); Constantine Medal (1898)
- Scientific career
- Fields: Botany, zoology, geology
- Workplaces: British Ornithologists' Union; Zoological Society of London
- Author abbrev. (zoology): Radde

Gustav Ferdinand Richard Radde (27 November 1831 – 16 March 1903) was a German naturalist and explorer of Siberia. Radde's warbler and several other species are named after him.

== Biography ==
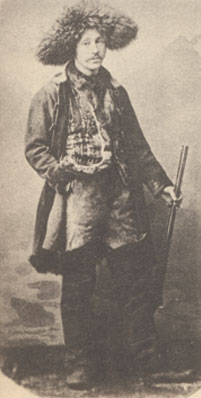
Gustav Radde as a young man, 1857

Radde was born in Danzig, the son of a schoolmaster. He had little formal education, and began a career as an apothecary. At an early age he was influenced by Anton Menge and became increasingly interested in natural history, and in 1852 he gave up his career and spent two years in the Crimea with the botanist Christian von Steven, collecting both plants and animals. He made further trips to southern Russia with Johann Friedrich von Brandt and Karl Ernst von Baer. He was botanist and zoologist on the East Siberian Expedition of 1855, led by the astronomer Ludwig Schwarz.

In 1864 he eventually settled in Tbilisi. In the same year he explored the region surrounding Mount Elbrus, the highest mountain in the Western Palearctic. As well as collecting many plants he recorded the languages, ballads and customs of the local tribes. He set up a museum (the Caucasus Museum) and library in Tbilisi to exhibit his discoveries. His collecting expeditions included visits along the Black Sea coast and eastwards beyond the Caspian Sea to Askhabad. In 1895 he sailed to India and Japan with the Grand Duke Michael, and two years later he was official naturalist on a visit by members of the Russian imperial family to North Africa. He eventually became a member of the Council of State in Tbilisi.

In 1884 he was honoured with the chairmanship of the first International Ornithological Congress in Vienna. He was also an honorary member of the Deutsche Ornithologen-Gesellschaft, and a foreign member of the British Ornithologists' Union and the Zoological Society of London. He was awarded the Patron's Medal of the Royal Geographical Society in 1889 and the Constantine Medal of the Imperial Russian Geographical Society in 1898.

== Eponyms ==
Animals named after him include birds such as Radde's warbler and Radde's accentor, and amphibians and reptiles such as the Mongolian toad (Pseudepidalea raddei), the Azerbaijan lizard (Darevskia raddei), a toadhead agama (Phrynocephalus raddei), and Radde's mountain viper (Montivipera raddei). He is also remembered in the names of Radde's vole (Stenocranius raddei), the Ciscaucasian hamster (Mesocricetus raddei), and Radde's shrew (Sorex raddei).

== Collections ==
Radde was an avid entomologist. His insect (and other) collections are divided: Transbaikal and Amur material is in the Zoological Museum of the Russian Academy of Science; Caucasus and Transcaspian material is in the Georgian National Museum Zoological Section, Tbilisi.

This botanist is denoted by the author abbreviation Radde when citing a botanical name.

== Works ==
His publications include:

- Reisen im Süden von Ost-Sibirien in den Jahren 1855-59 (“Travels in the south of eastern Siberia during the years 1855-59,” 1862–1863)
- Vier Vorträge über den Kaukasus (“Four essays on the Caucasus,” 1874)
- Die Chews'uren und ihr Land (“The Chews'uren and their land,” 1878)
- Ornis Caucasica. Die Vogelwelt des Kaukasus (“Ornis Caucasica. The world of birds in the Caucasus,” 1884) at archive.org
- Das Ostufer des Pontus (“The east bank of the Pontus,” 1894)
- Die Sammlungen des kaukasischen Museums (“The collections of the Caucasus Museum,” 1900 et seq.)

In 1892, he wrote a Russian description of his voyage with the grand dukes Alexander and Sergeis Mikhailovitch.
