= List of mammals of Idaho =

This list of mammals of Idaho includes all wild mammal species indigenous to the U.S. state of Idaho. Five mammal species introduced in the state include the eastern gray squirrel, Virginia opossum, house mouse, black rat, and the Norway rat. Mammals included in this list are drawn from the Idaho Department of Fish and Game.

== Eulipotyphla ==
=== Shrews ===
Family: Soricidae

- Masked shrew, Sorex cinereus
- American pygmy shrew, Sorex hoyi
- Merriam's shrew, Sorex merriami
- Montane shrew, Sorex monticolus
- Dwarf shrew, Sorex nanus
- American water shrew, Sorex palustris
- Vagrant shrew, Sorex vagrans

=== Moles ===
Family: Talpidae

- Coast mole, Scapanus orarius

== Didelphimorphia ==
=== Opossums ===
Family: Didelphidae

- Virginia opossum, Didelphis virginiana

== Rodents ==
=== Beavers ===
Family: Castoridae

- North American beaver, Castor canadensis

=== Pocket gophers ===
Family: Geomyidae

- Idaho pocket gopher, Thomomys idahoensis
- Northern pocket gopher, Thomomys talpoides
- Townsend's pocket gopher, Thomomys townsendii

=== Kangaroo rats and pocket mice ===
Family: Heteromyidae

- Chisel-toothed kangaroo rat, Dipodomys microps
- Ord's kangaroo rat, Dipodomys ordii
- Little pocket mouse, Perognathus longimembris
- Great Basin pocket mouse, Perognathus merriami

=== Porcupines ===
Family: Erethizontidae

- North American porcupine, Erethizon dorsatum

=== Jumping mice ===
Family: Dipodidae

- Western jumping mouse, Zapus princeps

=== New World rats, mice, and voles ===
Family: Cricetidae

- Sagebrush vole, Lemmiscus curtatus
- Long-tailed vole, Microtus longicaudus
- Montane vole, Microtus montanus
- Prairie vole, Microtus ochrogaster
- Meadow vole, Microtus pennsylvanicus
- Water vole, Microtus richardsoni
- Southern red-backed vole, Myodes gapperii
- Bushy-tailed woodrat, Neotoma cinerea
- Desert woodrat, Neotoma lepida
- Southern plains woodrat, Neotoma micropus
- Muskrat, Ondatra zibethicus
- Northern grasshopper mouse, Onychomys leucogaster
- Brush mouse, Peromyscus boylii
- Canyon mouse, Peromyscus crinitus
- White-footed mouse, Peromyscus leucopus
- Northern rock mouse, Peromyscus nasutus
- Western deer mouse, Peromyscus sonoriensis
- Pinyon mouse, Peromyscus truei
- Western heather vole, Phenacomys intermedius
- Western harvest mouse, Reithrodontomys megalotis
- Northern bog lemming, Synaptomys borealis

=== Old World rats, mice ===
Family: Muridae

- House mouse, Mus musculus introduced
- Norway rat, Rattus norvegicus introduced
- Black rat, Rattus rattus introduced

=== Chipmunks, marmots, squirrels ===
Family: Sciuridae

- White-tailed antelope squirrel, Ammospermophilus leucurus
- Golden-mantled ground squirrel, Callospermophilus lateralis
- Northern flying squirrel, Glaucomys sabrinus
- Hoary marmot, Marmota caligata
- Yellow-bellied marmot, Marmota flaviventris
- Rock squirrel, Otospermophilus variegatus
- Yellow-pine chipmunk, Neotamias amoenus
- Cliff chipmunk, Neotamias dorsalis
- Least chipmunk, Neotamias minimus
- Red-tailed chipmunk, Neotamias ruficaudus
- Hopi chipmunk, Neotamias rufus
- Uinta chipmunk, Neotamias umbrinus
- Eastern gray squirrel, Sciurus carolinensis introduced
- Fox squirrel, Sciurus niger introduced
- American red squirrel, Tamiasciurus hudsonicus
- Uinta ground squirrel, Urocitellus armatus
- Belding's ground squirrel, Urocitellus beldingi
- Northern Idaho ground squirrel, Urocitellus brunneus
- Merriam's ground squirrel, Urocitellus canus
- Columbian ground squirrel, Urocitellus columbianus
- Wyoming ground squirrel, Urocitellus elegans
- Southern Idaho ground squirrel, Urocitellus endemicus
- Piute ground squirrel, Urocitellus mollis

== Lagomorpha ==
=== Hares and rabbits ===
Family: Leporidae

- Pygmy rabbit, Brachylagus idahodensis
- Snowshoe hare, Lepus americanus
- Black-tailed jackrabbit, Lepus californicus
- White-tailed jackrabbit, Lepus townsendii
- Mountain cottontail, Sylvilagus nuttallii

=== Pikas ===
Family: Ochotonidae

- American pika, Ochotona princeps

== Chiroptera ==
=== Vesper bats ===
Family: Vespertilionidae

- Pallid bat, Antrozous pallidus
- Townsend's big-eared bat, Corynorhinus townsendii
- Big brown bat, Eptesicus fuscus
- Spotted bat, Euderma maculatum
- Silver-haired bat, Lasionycteris noctivagans
- Eastern red bat, Lasiurus borealis
- Hoary bat, Lasiurus cinereus
- California myotis, Myotis californicus
- Western small-footed myotis, Myotis ciliolabrum
- Long-eared myotis, Myotis evotis
- Little brown bat, Myotis lucifugus
- Fringed myotis, Myotis thysanodes
- Long-legged myotis, Myotis volans
- Yuma myotis, Myotis yumanensis
- Western pipistrelle, Parastrellus hesperus

=== Free-tailed bats ===
Family: Molossidae

- Big free-tailed bat, Nyctinomops macrotis
- Mexican free-tailed bat, Tadarida brasiliensis

== Carnivora ==
=== Cats ===
Family: Felidae

- Canada lynx, Lynx canadensis
- Bobcat, Lynx rufus
- Cougar, Puma concolor

=== Canines ===
Family: Canidae

- Coyote, Canis latrans
- Gray wolf, Canis lupus reintroduced
  - Northwestern wolf, C. l. occidentalis reintroduced
- Gray fox, Urocyon cinereoargenteus
- Kit fox, Vulpes macrotis
- Red fox, Vulpes vulpes

=== Bears ===
Family: Ursidae

- American black bear, Ursus americanus
- Brown bear, Ursus arctos
  - Grizzly bear, U. a. horribilis

=== Skunks ===
Family: Mephitidae

- Striped skunk, Mephitis mephitis
- Western spotted skunk, Spilogale gracilis

=== Weasels ===
Family: Mustelidae

- Wolverine, Gulo gulo
- North American river otter, Lontra canadensis
- Pacific marten, Martes caurina
- Black-footed ferret, Mustela nigripes extirpated
- American ermine, Mustela richardsonii
- Long-tailed weasel, Neogale frenata
- American mink, Neogale vison
- Fisher, Pekania pennanti
- American badger, Taxidea taxus

=== Raccoons ===
Family: Procyonidae

- Ringtail, Bassariscus astutus
- Raccoon, Procyon lotor

== Artiodactyla ==
=== Pronghorns ===
Family: Antilocapridae

- Pronghorn, Antilocapra americana

=== Deer ===
Family: Cervidae

- Moose, Alces alces
- Elk, Cervus canadensis
  - Rocky Mountain elk, C. c. nelsoni
- Mule deer, Odocoileus hemionus
- White-tailed deer, Odocoileus virginianus
- Caribou, Rangifer tarandus extirpated
  - Boreal woodland caribou, R. t. caribou extirpated

=== Bovids ===
Family: Bovidae

- American bison, Bison bison
- Mountain goat, Oreamnos americanus
- Bighorn sheep, Ovis canadensis

== See also ==
- List of regional mammals lists
- List of prehistoric mammals
- Mammal classification
