= List of mammals of Utah =

This is a list of mammals observed in the U.S. state of Utah.

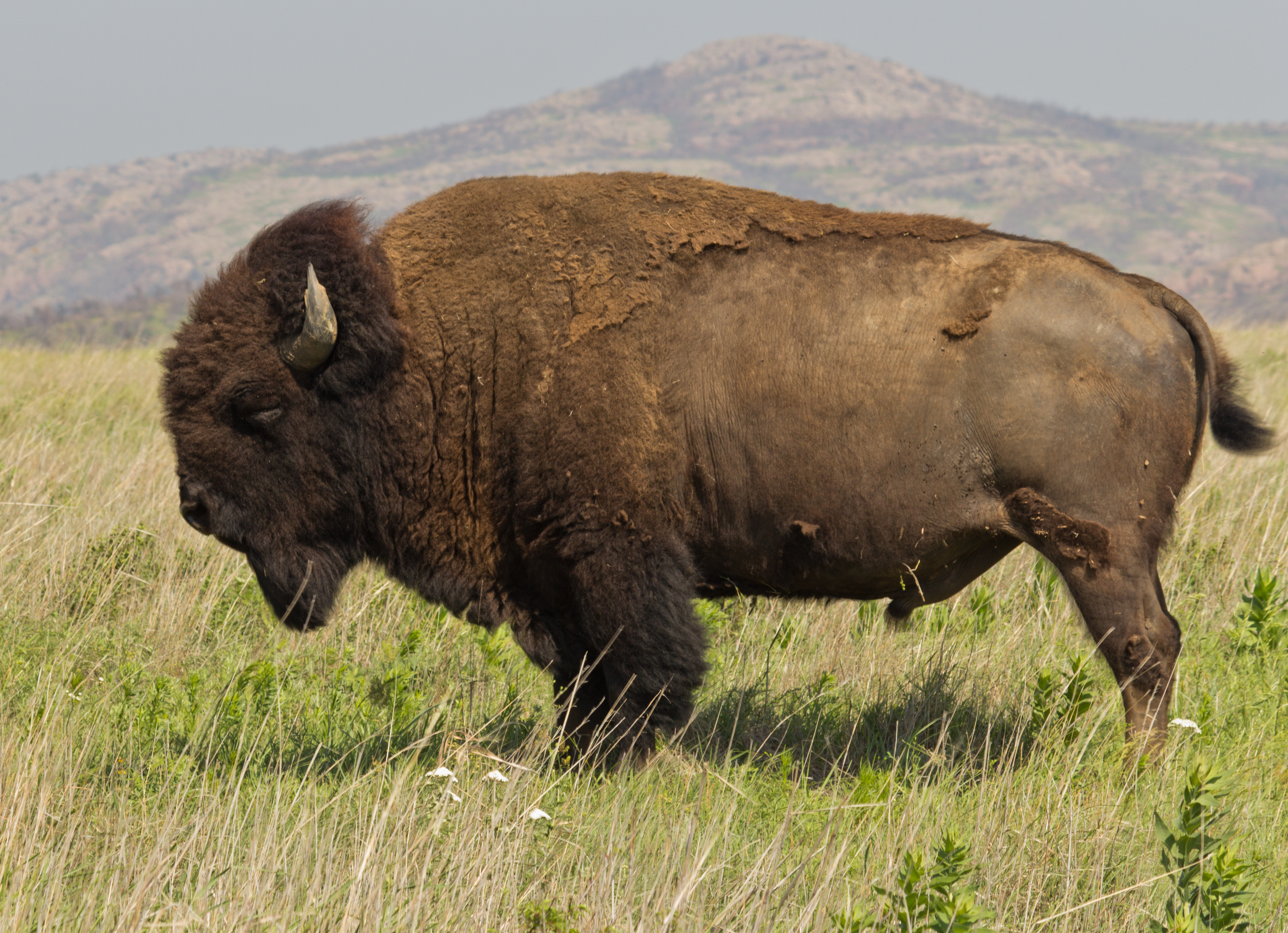
American bison

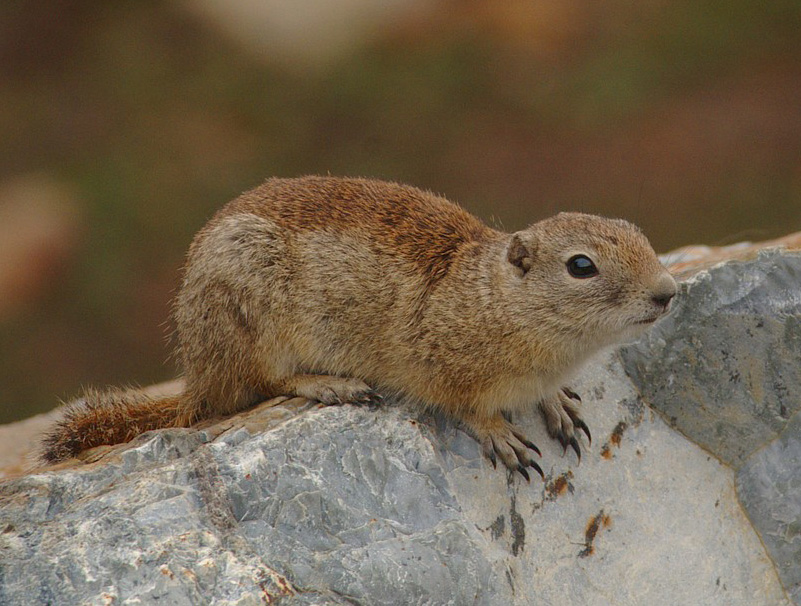
Belding's ground squirrel

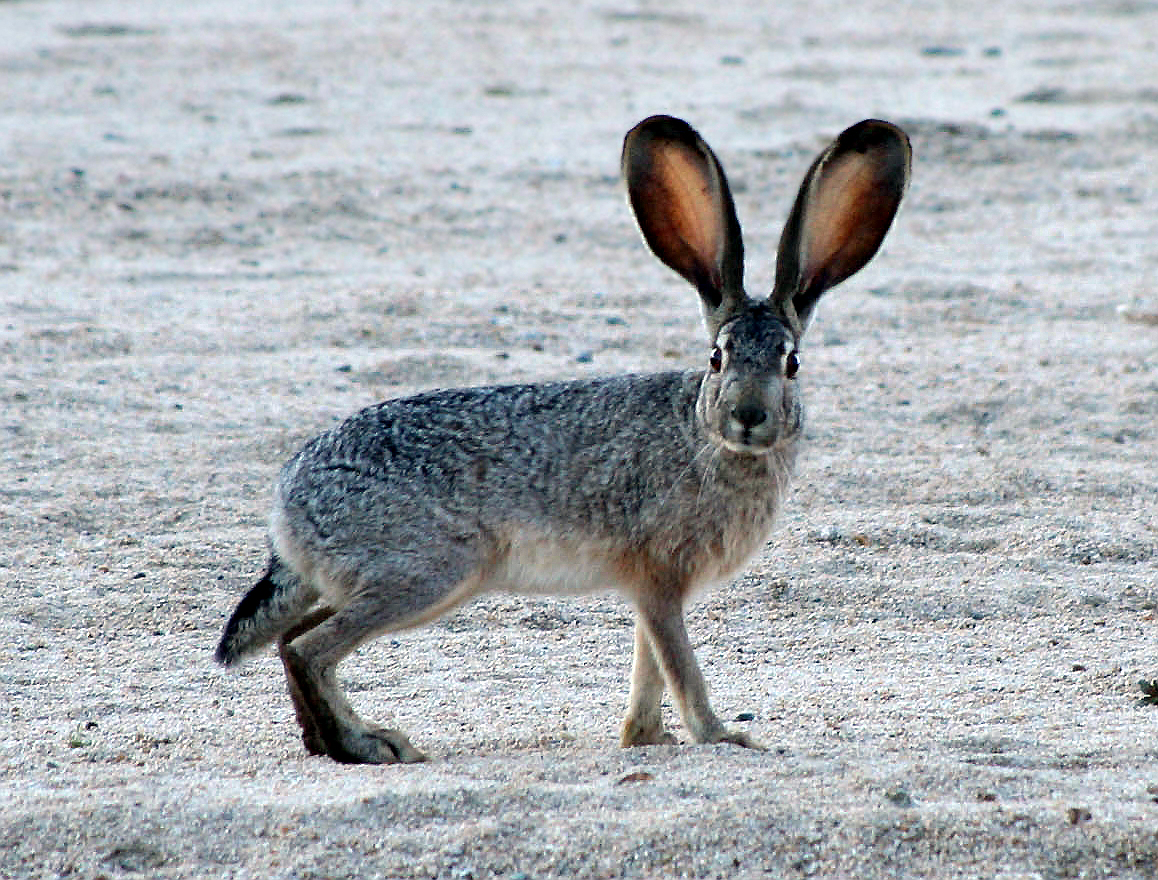
Black-tailed jackrabbit

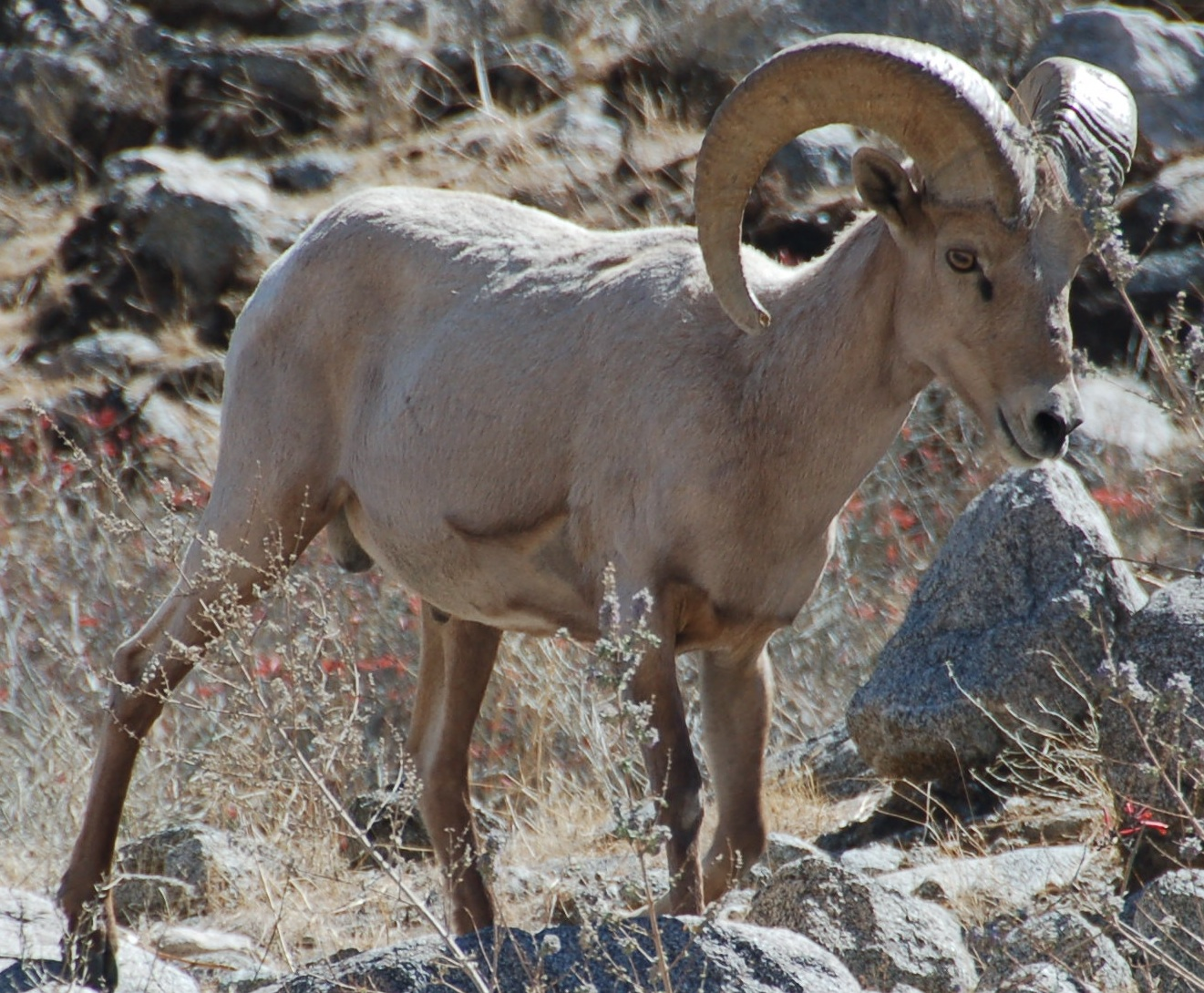
Desert bighorn sheep

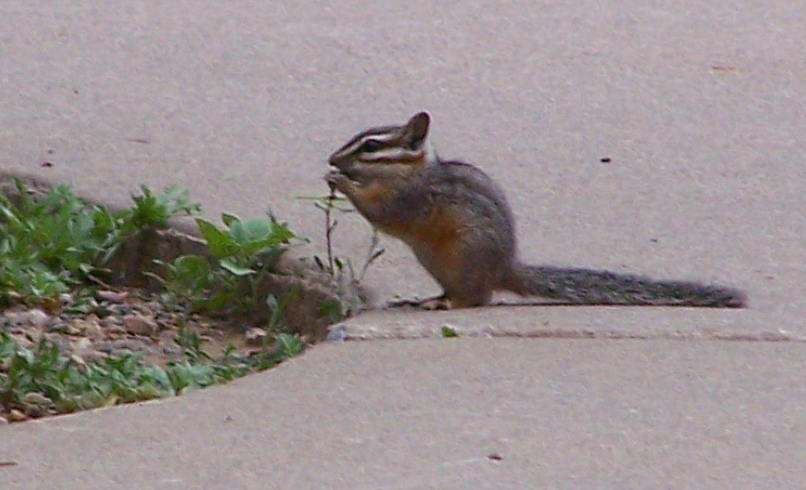
Cliff chipmunk

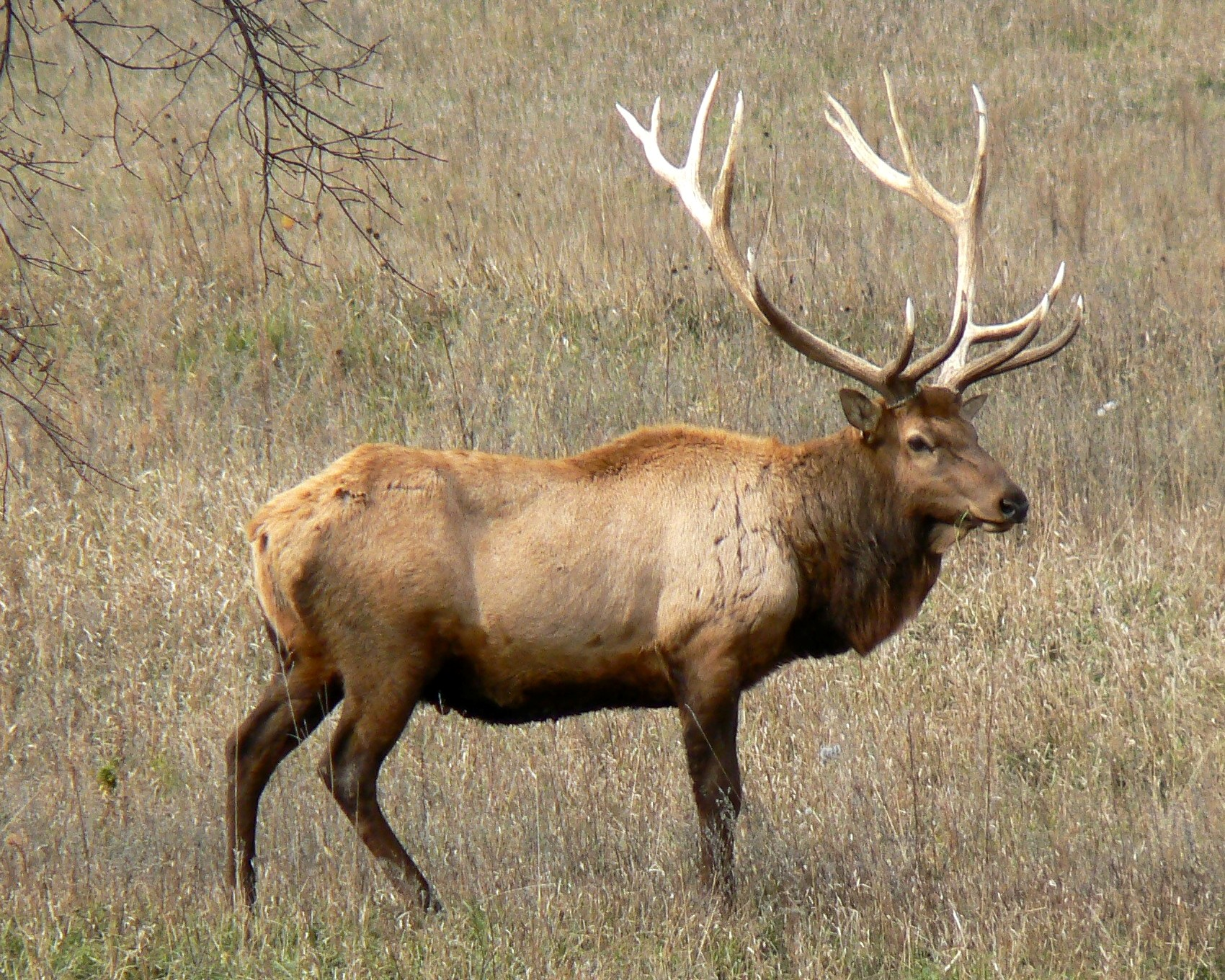
Elk

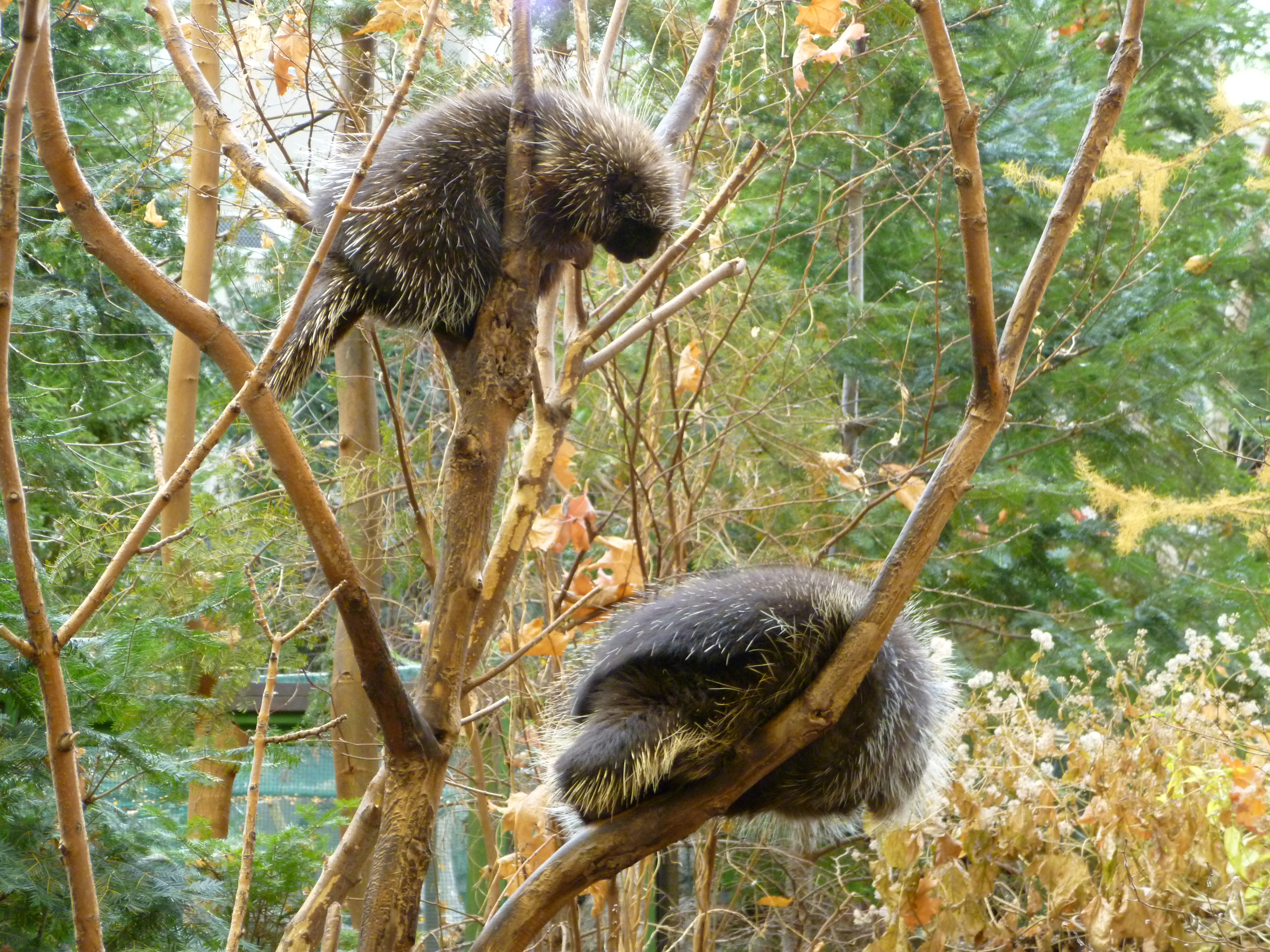
North American porcupine

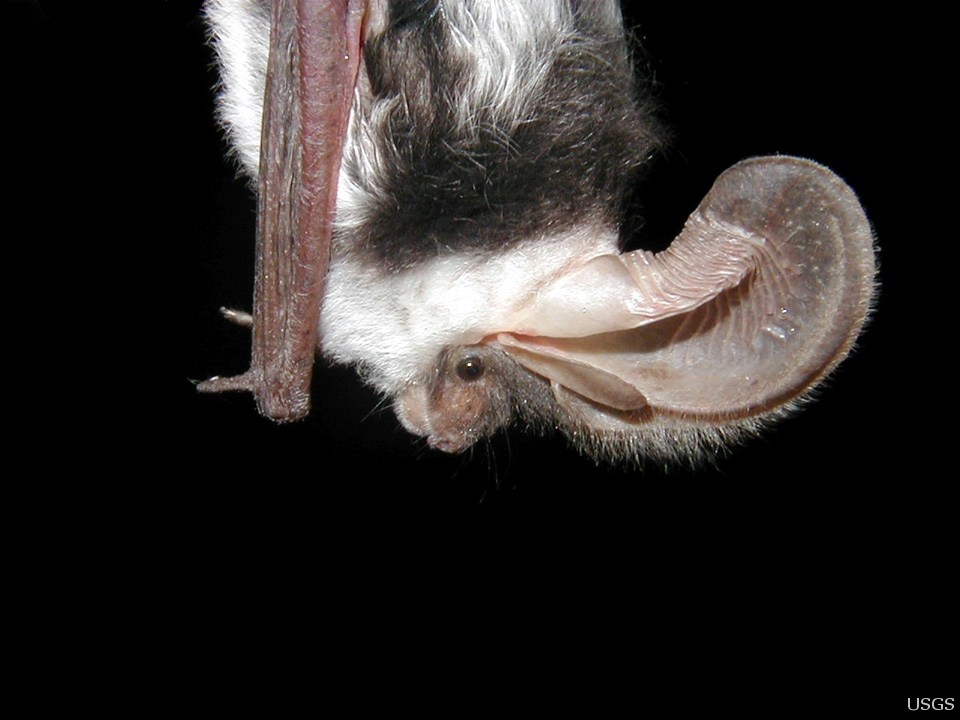
Spotted bat

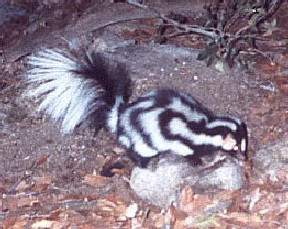
Western spotted skunk

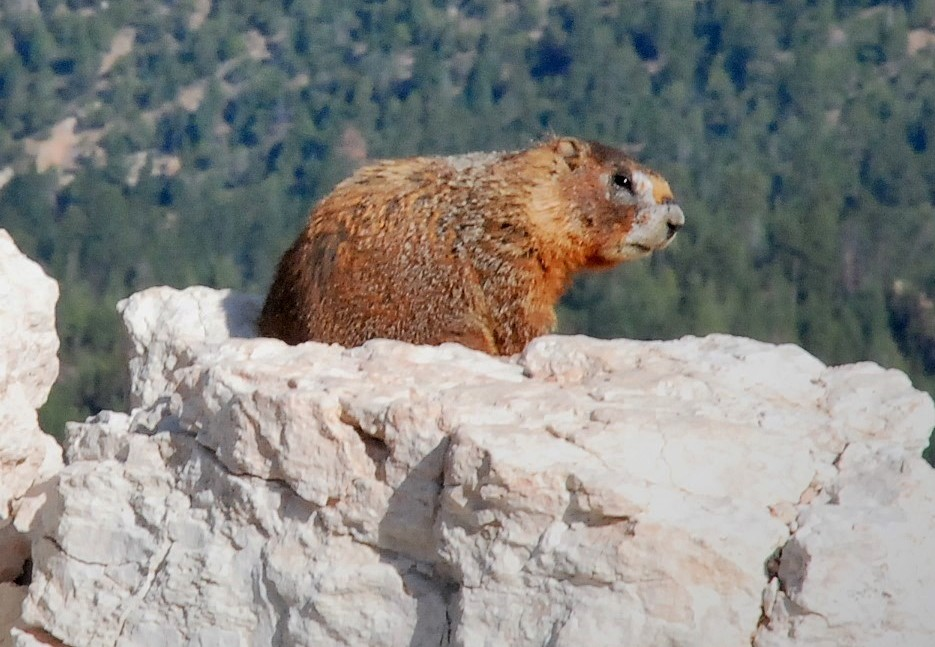
Yellow-bellied marmot

- Abert's squirrel (Sciurus aberti)
- Allen's big-eared bat (Idionycteris phyllotis)
- American badger (Taxidea taxus)
- American bison (Bison bison)
- American black bear (Ursus americanus)
- American ermine (Mustela richardsonii)
- American pika (Ochotona princeps)
- American red squirrel (Tamiasciurus hudsonicus)
- American water shrew (Sorex palustris)
- Arizona woodrat (Neotoma devia)
- American mink (Neogale vison)
- Belding's ground squirrel (Urocitellus beldingi)
- Big brown bat (Eptesicus fuscus)
- Big free-tailed bat (Nyctinomops macrotis)
- Black rat (Rattus rattus) introduced
- Black-footed ferret (Mustela nigripes)
- Black-tailed jackrabbit (Lepus californicus)
- Bobcat (Lynx rufus)
- Botta's pocket gopher (Thomomys bottae)
- Grizzly bear (Ursus arctos horribilis) extirpated
- Brown rat (Rattus norvegicus) introduced
- Brush mouse (Peromyscus boylii)
- Bushy-tailed woodrat (Neotoma cinerea)
- Cactus mouse (Peromyscus eremicus)
- California myotis (Myotis californicus)
- Canada lynx (Lynx canadensis)
- Canyon mouse (Peromyscus crinitus)
- Chisel-toothed kangaroo rat (Dipodomys microps)
- Cinereus shrew (Sorex cinereus)
- Cliff chipmunk (Neotamias dorsalis)
- Cougar (Puma concolor)
- Coyote (Canis latrans)
- Crawford's gray shrew (Notiosorex crawfordi)
- Dark kangaroo mouse (Microdipodops megacephalus)
- Desert bighorn sheep (Ovis canadensis nelsoni)
- Desert cottontail (Sylvilagus audubonii)
- Desert kangaroo rat (Dipodomys deserti)
- Desert pocket mouse (Chaetodipus penicillatus)
- Desert woodrat (Neotoma lepida)
- Dwarf shrew (Sorex nanus)
- Elk (Cervus canadensis)
- Fox squirrel (Sciurus niger) introduced
- Fringed myotis (Myotis thysanodes)
- Golden-mantled ground squirrel (Callospermophilus lateralis)
- Gray fox (Urocyon cinereoargenteus)
- Gray wolf (Canis lupus) extirpated, vagrant
- Great Basin pocket mouse (Perognathus parvus)
- Hoary bat (Lasiurus cinereus)
- House mouse (Mus musculus) introduced
- Kit fox (Vulpes macrotis)
- Least chipmunk (Neotamias minimus)
- Little brown bat (Myotis lucifugus)
- Long-eared myotis (Myotis evotis)
- Long-legged myotis (Myotis volans)
- Long-tailed vole (Microtus longicaudus)
- Long-tailed weasel (Neogale frenata)
- Meadow vole (Microtus pennsylvanicus)
- Mexican free-tailed bat (Tadarida brasiliensis)
- Montane shrew (Sorex monticolus)
- Montane vole (Microtus montanus)
- Moose (Alces alces)
- Mountain cottontail (Sylvilagus nuttallii)
- Mountain goat (Oreamnos americanus) introduced
- Mule deer (Odocoileus hemionus)
- Muskrat (Ondatra zibethicus)
- North American beaver (Castor canadensis)
- North American porcupine (Erethizon dorsatum)
- North American donkey (Equus asinus) introduced
- North American river otter (Lontra canadensis)
- Northern flying squirrel (Glaucomys sabrinus)
- Northern grasshopper mouse (Onychomys leucogaster)
- Northern pocket gopher (Thomomys talpoides)
- Ord's kangaroo rat (Dipodomys ordii)
- Pacific marten (Martes caurina)
- Pinyon mouse (Peromyscus truei)
- Piute ground squirrel (Urocitellus mollis)
- Pronghorn (Antilocapra americana)
- Raccoon (Procyon lotor)
- Red fox (Vulpes vulpes)
- Ring-tailed cat (Bassariscus astutus)
- Rock squirrel (Otospermophilus variegatus)
- Rocky Mountain bighorn sheep (Ovis canadensis canadensis)
- Silver-haired bat (Lasionycteris noctivagans)
- Snowshoe hare (Lepus americanus)
- Southern red-backed vole (Clethrionomys gapperi)
- Spotted bat (Euderma maculatum)
- Striped skunk (Mephitis mephitis)
- Townsend's big-eared bat (Corynorhinus townsendii)
- Uinta chipmunk (Neotamias umbrinus)
- Uinta ground squirrel (Urocitellus armatus)
- Utah prairie dog (Cynomys parvidens)
- Vagrant shrew (Sorex vagrans)
- Water vole (Microtus richardsoni)
- Western deer mouse (Peromyscus sonoriensis)
- Western harvest mouse (Reithrodontomys megalotis)
- Western heather vole (Phenacomys intermedius)
- Western jumping mouse (Zapus princeps)
- Western small-footed bat (Myotis ciliolabrum)
- Western spotted skunk (Spilogale gracilis)
- White-tailed antelope squirrel (Ammospermophilus leucurus)
- White-tailed deer (Odocoileus virginianus)
- White-tailed jackrabbit (Lepus townsendii)
- Wild horse (Equus ferus caballus) introduced
- Wolverine (Gulo gulo) vagrant
- Yellow-bellied marmot (Marmota flaviventris)
