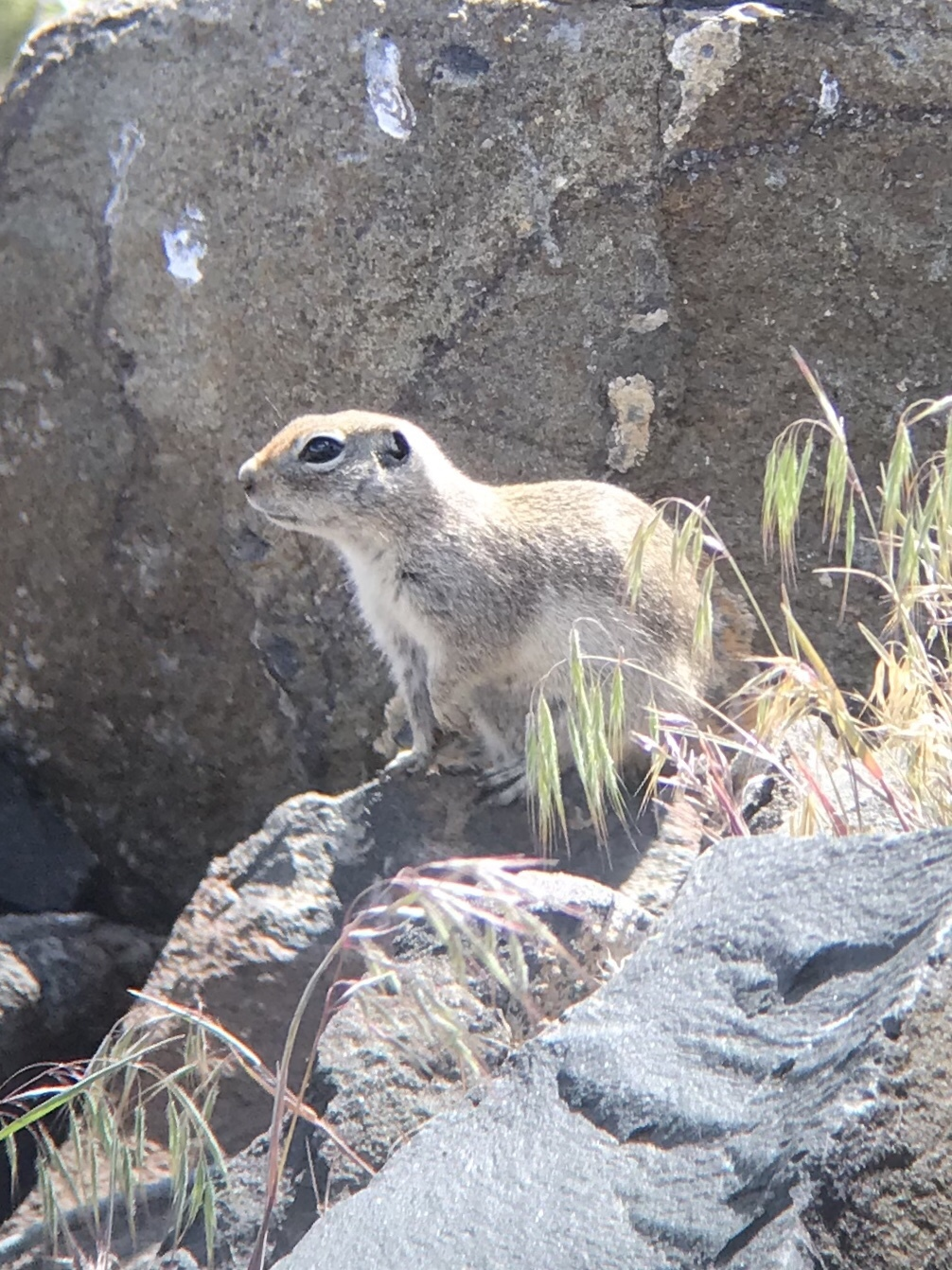

Conservation status
- Vulnerable (IUCN 3.1)

Scientific classification
- Kingdom: Animalia
- Phylum: Chordata
- Class: Mammalia
- Order: Rodentia
- Family: Sciuridae
- Genus: Urocitellus
- Species: U. townsendii

Binomial name
- Urocitellus townsendii (Bachman, 1839)

Synonyms
- Spermophilus townsendii Bachman, 1839

= Townsend's ground squirrel =

Species of rodent

Townsend's ground squirrel (Urocitellus townsendii) is a species of rodent in the family Sciuridae. It is found in high desert shrublands in several areas of the United States.

== Distribution ==
Townsend's ground squirrel is found in the Great Basin and the Columbia Plateau. Its range includes south-central Washington, eastern Oregon, southern Idaho, western Utah, most of Nevada, and extreme eastern California. The subspecies are distributed as follows:

- Urocitellus townsendii artemesiae – south-central Idaho
- U. t. canus (Merriam's ground squirrel) – eastern Oregon; northeastern corner of California; northwestern corner of Nevada
- U. t. idahoensis – southwestern Idaho
- U. t. mollis (Piute ground squirrel) – eastern California; southeastern Oregon; southern Idaho; western Utah; Nevada; most widely distributed subspecies
- U. t. nancyae – south-central Washington
- U. t. townsendii – south-central Washington
- U. t. vigilis – Snake River Canyon bottomlands of east-central Oregon and west-central Idaho

Townsend's ground squirrels typically inhabit arid grasslands and shrub-grasslands. Malheur ground squirrels, however, inhabit the relatively mesic and fertile Snake River Plain. Plant communities in which Townsend's ground squirrels occur include crested wheatgrass (Agropyron cristatum), big sagebrush (Artemisia tridentata) wheatgrass, rabbitbrush (Chrysothamnus spp.), shadscale (Atriplex confertifolia), and winterfat (Kraschenninikovia lanata) grasslands.

In southeastern Idaho, the density of Townsend's ground squirrel burrows is highest on winterfat-Sandberg bluegrass (Poa secunda), intermediate in big sagebrush-Thurber needlegrass (Stipa thurberiana), and lowest in shadscale-Indian ricegrass (Oryzopsis hymenoides) and thread grass (Stipa comata) . Burrow densities were highly variable in mixed exotic annual communities, and negatively correlated with cheatgrass (Bromus tectorum) . They increase with increasing native grass cover, but the populations are unstable when native grass cover is overly high.

== Preferred habitat ==
Although Townsend's ground squirrels occur in arid environments, within those environments they are most common around desert springs and irrigated fields. They also occupy ridgetops, hillsides, and valley bottoms, canal and railroad embankments, and old fields. As a burrowing species, Townsend's ground squirrels select sites with deep, friable, well-drained soils. In southeastern Idaho, 68% of Townsend's ground squirrel burrows were in sand, 28% in silt, and 4% in clay.

Smith and Johnson reported a mean home range of 1,357 square meters for 14 Snake Valley ground squirrels. Townsend's ground squirrel density can fluctuate greatly from year to year. Estimated population density of Snake Valley ground squirrels ranged from 3 to 32 individuals per hectare. Densities of 296 to 331 individuals per hectare have been reported for Piute ground squirrels.

== Timing of major life events ==
Townsend's ground squirrels become dormant in late spring or early summer, after grasses cure. They emerge from dormancy in late winter. Dormancy lasts 7.5 to 9 continuous months. It is shorter in wet years, when green forage is available later in summer, than in dry years.

Females breed as yearlings. Most males also breed as yearlings, although male Snake Valley ground squirrels breed at 2 years of age. Most breeding occurs in late January or early February, just after dormancy ends. Piute ground squirrels breed from mid-February to early March, somewhat later than other subspecies. Gestation is about 24 days. One litter is produced per year, with 6 to 10 pups per litter. Pups are born hairless and with eyes closed. Early postnatal development of Townsend's ground squirrels is relatively slow compared to development of other Spermophilus species. Pups open their eyes at 19 to 22 days of age, and are weaned shortly thereafter.

== Cover requirements ==
Townsend's ground squirrels occupy open habitats and use burrows for shelter, protection from predators, and food storage. Burrows are often grouped into colonies, but some Townsend's ground squirrels are solitary. Except when mothers have pups, there is only one Townsend's ground squirrel per burrow. Burrows have one to many openings and may have numerous auxiliary burrows in addition to the "home" or nest burrow. Burrow dimensions of Townsend's ground squirrels in southeastern Idaho ranged from 2.6 to 3.8 inches (6.5–9.6 cm) horizontally and from 1.7 to 2.5 inches (4.3–6.3 cm) vertically.

Townsend's ground squirrels have been observed climbing shrubs while foraging, apparently for cover and to spot palatable vegetation.

== Food habits ==
Townsend's ground squirrels consume mainly green vegetation and some seeds and insects. Green grasses are apparently a staple from late winter until just prior to grass senescence and Townsend ground squirrel estivation, when seeds become the primary diet item. Seeds are an important source of calories just prior to estivation. Where present, winterfat is browsed heavily, but only light browsing of other shrubs has been reported. From March through May on the Arid Land Ecology Reserve in eastern Washington, the Townsend's ground squirrel diet is 49% Sandberg bluegrass, 11% western yarrow (Achillea millefolium var. occidentalis), 8% pinnate tansymustard (Descurania pinnata) seed, 31% other plant species (mostly forbs), and 1% insects. On a big sagebrush-crested wheatgrass community in southeastern Idaho, 80% of Townsend's ground squirrels trapped in June had consumed crested wheatgrass, and Townsend's ground squirrels became dormant after the crested wheatgrass senesced. Cheatgrass (Bromus tectorum) is an important food item in some years. As an annual with wide year-to-year swings in productivity, however, it is not a reliable food source.

Adult cannibalism of unweaned young has been observed in the Townsend's ground squirrel.

== Predators ==
Townsend's ground squirrels are the primary prey of ferruginous hawks (Buteo regalis) in the Great Basin and Columbia Plateau. They are also a major and often primary diet item of prairie falcons (Falco mexicanus). The Townsend's ground squirrel has been rated one of the two most important prey species in southeastern Idaho because of its importance to ferruginous hawks and prairie falcons. Other important predators of Townsend's ground squirrels include other hawks (Accipiter and Buteo spp.) and falcons (Falco spp.), common crows (Corvus corax), badgers (Taxidea taxus), coyotes (Canis latrans), long-tailed weasels (Mestrela frenata), western rattlesnakes (Crotalus viridis), and gopher snakes (Pituophis melanoleucus).
