= S. canus =

S. canus may refer to:

- Scytalopus canus, a bird species
- Spermophilus canus, a rodent species
