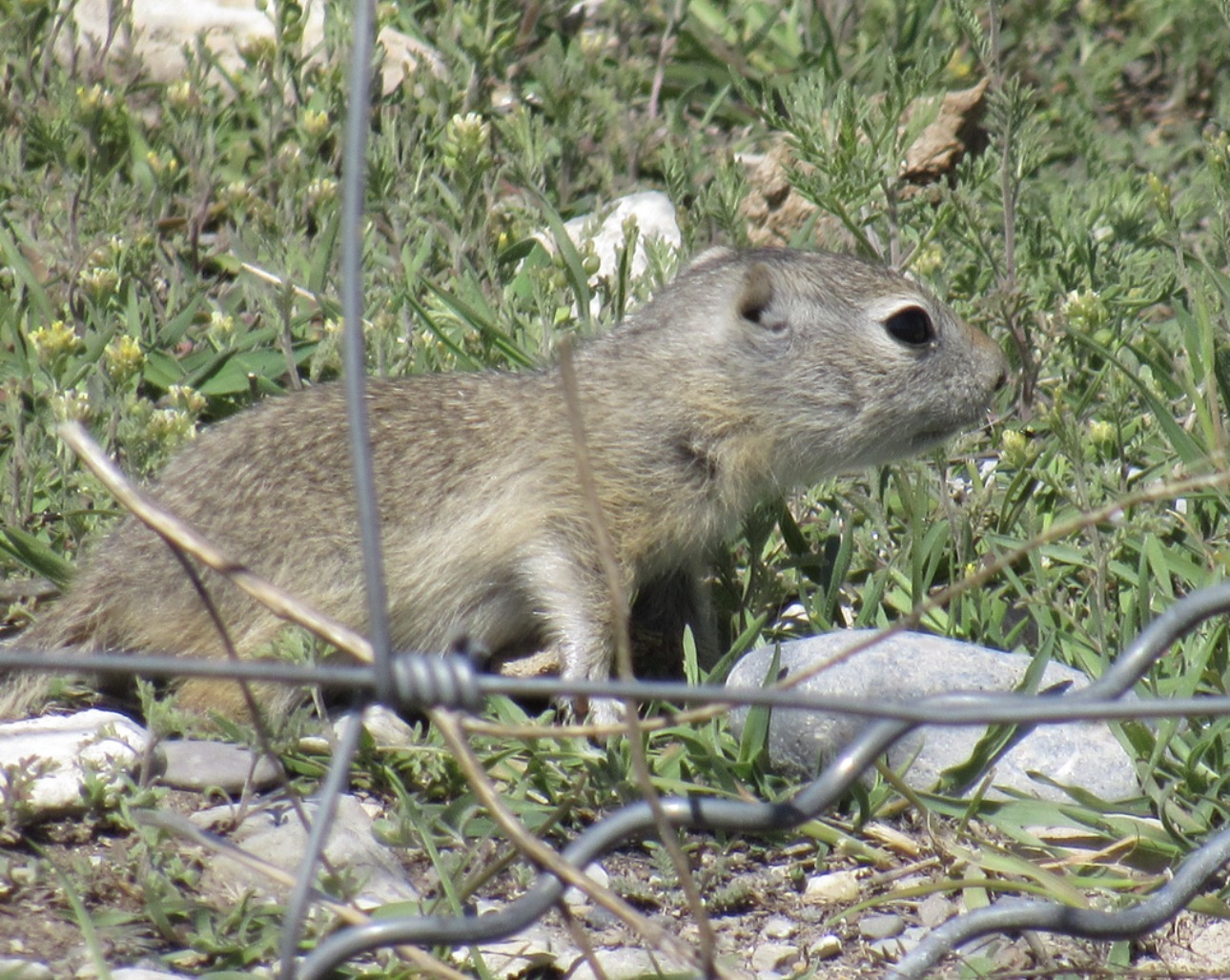
- Eastern Snake River Plains ground squirrel

Scientific classification
- Kingdom: Animalia
- Phylum: Chordata
- Class: Mammalia
- Order: Rodentia
- Family: Sciuridae
- Genus: Urocitellus
- Species: U. idahoensis

Binomial name
- Urocitellus idahoensis (C. H. Merriam, 1913)

Subspecies
- U. i. idahoensis (Western Snake River Plains ground squirrel) (C. H. Merriam, 1913); U. i. artemesiae (Eastern Snake River Plains ground squirrel) (C. H. Merriam, 1913)

= Snake River Plains ground squirrel =

Species of rodent

The Snake River Plains ground squirrel (Urocitellus idahoensis) is a species of rodent in the family Sciuridae endemic to Idaho in the western United States. It was formerly considered to be a subspecies of the Piute ground squirrel, before being identified as a distinct species on the basis of genetic differences in 2025.

== Taxonomy and systematics ==
The species is part of the "small-eared" species group of Urocitellus ground squirrels, which are endemic to the Great Basin and surrounding cold desert ecosystems of the western United States. Historically, populations north of the Snake River in Idaho were classified as subspecies of the Piute ground squirrel (U. mollis) under the names U. m. idahoensis and U. m. artemesiae.

Integrative taxonomic analysis using two multilocus nuclear DNA datasets (five nuclear genes and thousands of ultraconserved elements) provided decisive support for recognizing these northern populations as a distinct species. Genetic divergence between populations north (U. idahoensis) and south (U. mollis) of the Snake River is deep, with the lineages even being non-sister taxa.

== Description ==
The Snake River Plains ground squirrel is a small-to-medium-bodied, fossorial ground squirrel within the small-eared group. Members of this group are characterized by pale coloration and adaptations to arid, desert-dwelling environments.

Cranial morphology shows differentiation between the two subspecies : U. i. idahoensis is generally larger-bodied with a more robust cranium and dentition, while U. i. artemesiae is relatively smaller with a more slender cranium.

Like other small-eared Urocitellus, it is an obligate heterotherm, hibernating through winter and estivating in summer.

== Distribution and habitat ==
This species is endemic to Idaho, United States. Its range is entirely north of the east-west flowing Snake River, which forms the southern boundary separating it from the Piute ground squirrel. The species inhabits the sagebrush-steppe habitats of the Snake River Plain. Its maximal range area is approximately 29,700 km² across 22 counties, but its distribution within this area is highly discontinuous.
