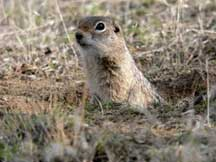

Conservation status
- Near Threatened (IUCN 3.1)

Scientific classification
- Kingdom: Animalia
- Phylum: Chordata
- Class: Mammalia
- Order: Rodentia
- Family: Sciuridae
- Genus: Urocitellus
- Species: U. washingtoni

Binomial name
- Urocitellus washingtoni (A.H.Howell, 1938)

Synonyms
- Spermophilus washingtoni A. H. Howell, 1938

= Washington ground squirrel =

Species of rodent

The Washington ground squirrel (Urocitellus washingtoni) is near threatened species of squirrel distributed in the Pacific Northwest states of Washington and Oregon, United States.

== Distribution ==
The Washington ground squirrel lives in sagebrush or grassland habitats in the Columbia River Basin of Washington and Oregon. Washington ground squirrels hibernate/estivate 7–8 months each year. Adults breed shortly after emergence from hibernation in January or February and juveniles emerge from the natal burrow in March. Juveniles disperse away from the natal burrow and settle into new areas. All Washington ground squirrels gain weight and prepare for hibernation in late spring and early summer. Juveniles immerge for estivation in June or July, and adults begin estivating earlier, often in June.

One radiotracking study focused on dispersal of Washington ground squirrels. It found that 72% percent of juvenile males dispersed in April. Dispersal distances ranged from 40 to 3521 meters and the median dispersal distance was 880 meters. Twenty to 56% of radio-collared juvenile squirrels survived to estivation. Raptors and badgers were the primary causes of mortality. Survival rates of dispersers were higher than non-dispersers, mostly due to badger predation on natal sites.

== Conservation ==
The species is listed as endangered in Oregon and is a candidate for endangered species listing in the United States, but is not currently listed. The IUCN formerly listed the species as vulnerable, but currently it is listed as near threatened.

== See also ==
- Ground squirrel
