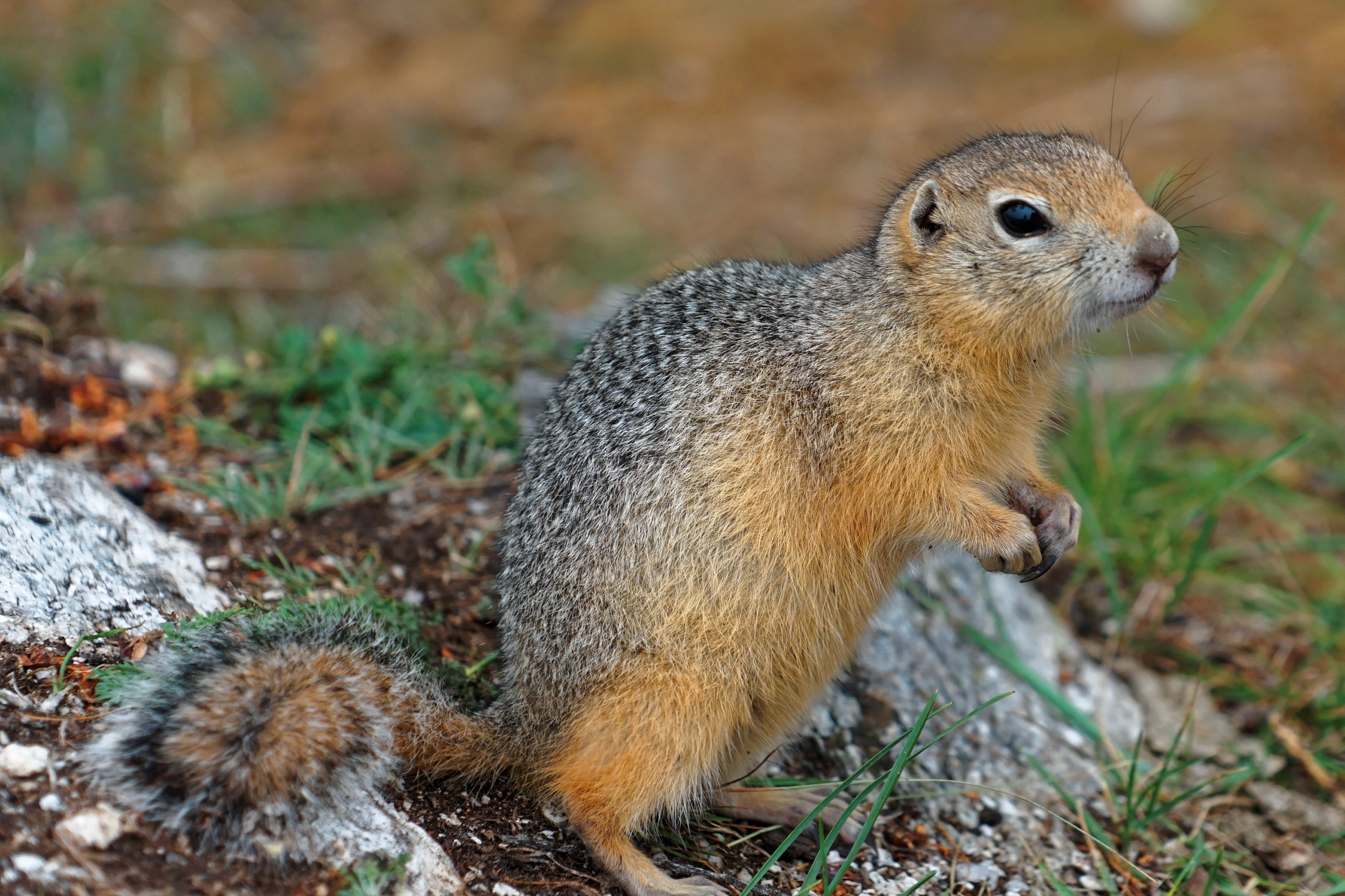

Conservation status
- Least Concern (IUCN 3.1)

Scientific classification
- Kingdom: Animalia
- Phylum: Chordata
- Class: Mammalia
- Order: Rodentia
- Family: Sciuridae
- Genus: Urocitellus
- Species: U. undulatus

Binomial name
- Urocitellus undulatus (Pallas, 1778)

Synonyms
- Arctomys altaicus; Citellus eversmanni; Citellus undulatus; Spermophilus undulatus

= Long-tailed ground squirrel =

Species of rodent

The long-tailed ground squirrel or Eversmann's souslik (Urocitellus undulatus) is a species of rodent in the squirrel family Sciuridae. It is found in China, Kazakhstan, Mongolia, and Russia.

== Description ==
The long-tailed ground squirrel has a compact, low-slung body, short legs and a long bushy tail. The body length reaches up to 315 millimetres (12.4 in) and the tail 160 millimetres (6.3 in). The back is brown with a linear pattern of dark, small spots. The underparts are a paler ochre-brown with a reddish tinge along the side. The tail is barred in brown and black with a prominent light edge stripe and a pale tip.

== Distribution and range ==
This species is found in submontane steppes up to 3,100 metres (10,200 ft), plains, meadows, the edges of pine forests and birch woods, clearings and agricultural land from Southern Siberia and Altai (Russia) to Manchuria. There are two isolated populations in Eastern Siberia, one in southeastern Yakutia and the other in the south of the Amur region. It also occurs in Mongolia and in the northwestern and northeastern parts of China.

== Behavior ==
The long-tailed ground squirrel lives in colonies with a labyrinth of burrows. In light sandy soils these are up to 3 metres (9.8 ft) deep with a single entrance hole surrounded by a large mound of soil up to 2 metres (6.6 ft) in diameter. The underground passages extend up to 15 metres (49 ft). In heavier clay soils, the holes are about 2 metres (6.6 ft) deep, stretch 5–7 metres (16–23 ft) and have several entrances. The animals awake from hibernation in March and the young are born about a month later. There are usually five to eight young in a brood. Activity is concentrated in the early morning and then again in the afternoon and evening, the animals retiring to their burrows in the middle of the day. The diet consists of green vegetation, seeds, insects, bulbs and roots. Before hibernation begins in October, up to 6 kilograms (13 lb) of vegetation and grain are stored in the burrows.
