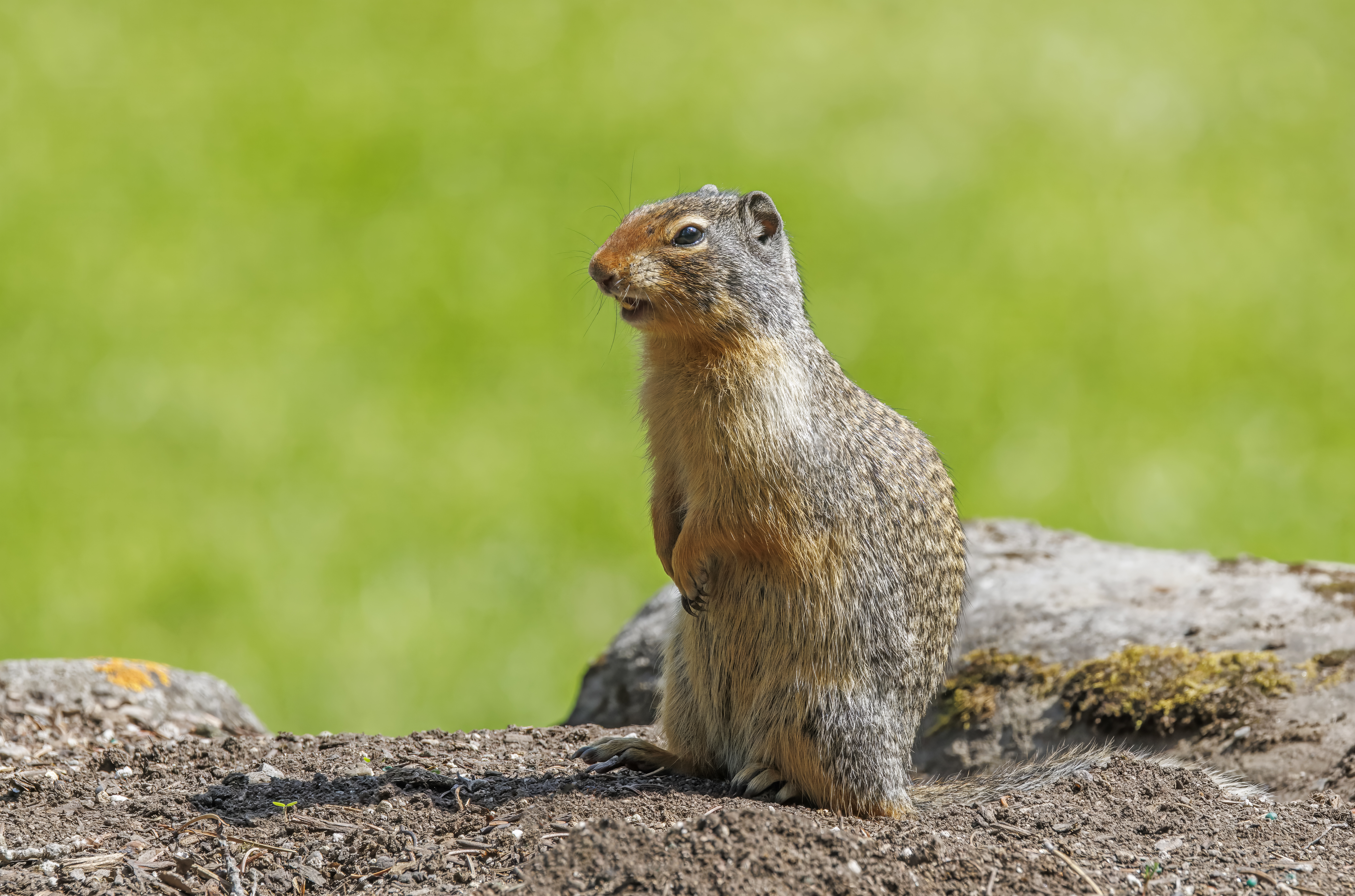
- in Banff, Alberta, Canada

Conservation status
- Least Concern (IUCN 3.1)

Scientific classification
- Kingdom: Animalia
- Phylum: Chordata
- Class: Mammalia
- Infraclass: Placentalia
- Order: Rodentia
- Family: Sciuridae
- Genus: Urocitellus
- Species: U. columbianus

Binomial name
- Urocitellus columbianus (Ord, 1815)
- Distribution of the Columbian ground squirrel

Synonyms
- List: Arctomys columbianus Ord, 1815; Spermophilus columbianus Merriam and Stejneger, 1891; S. c. albertae Allen, 1903; Anisonyx brachiura Rafinesque, 1817

= Columbian ground squirrel =

Species of rodent

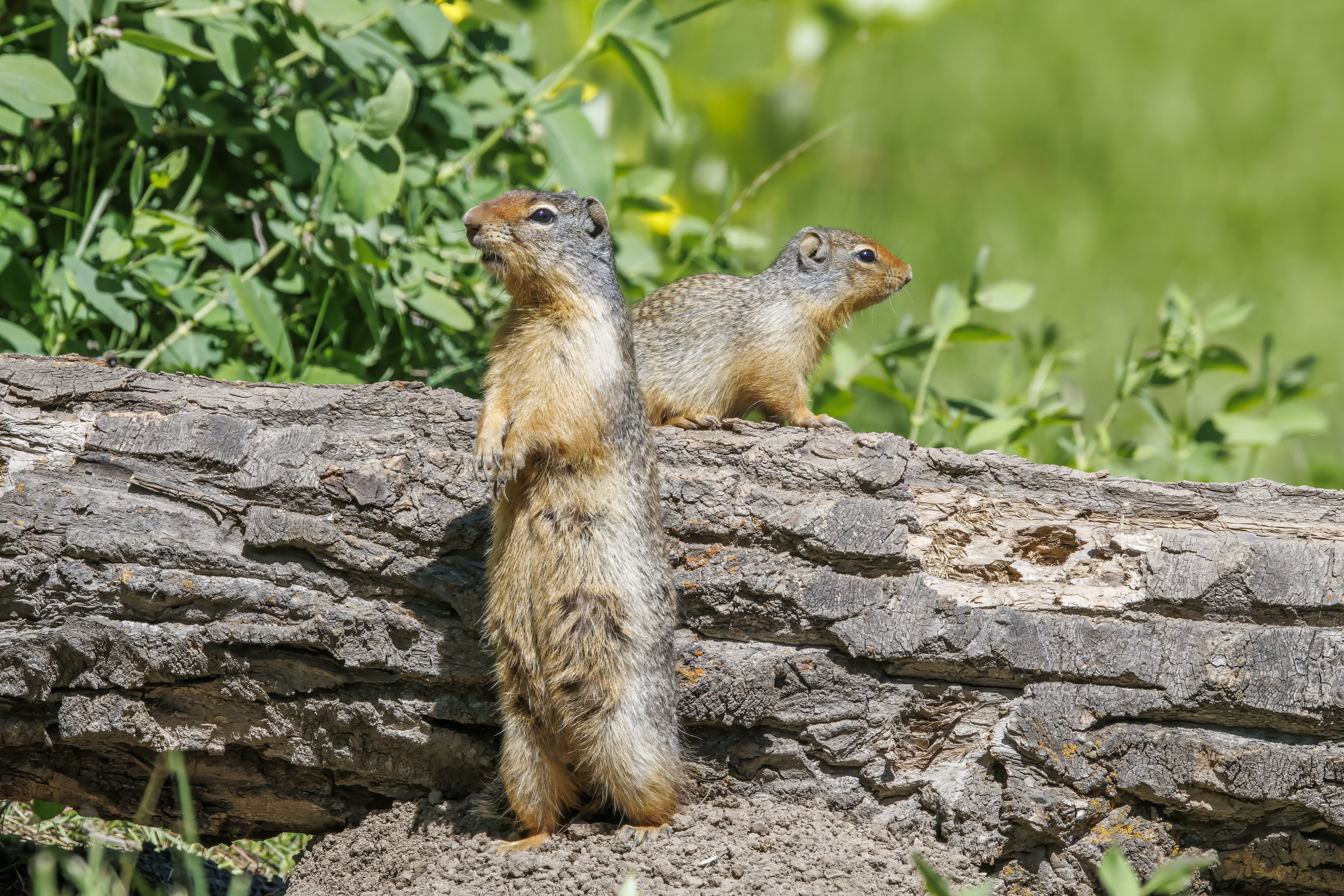
with juvenile, Banff, Albert

The Columbian ground squirrel (Urocitellus columbianus) is a species of rodent common in certain regions of Canada and the northwestern United States. It is the second largest member of the genus Urocitellus, which is part of the tribe Marmotini, along with marmots, chipmunks, prairie dogs, and other holarctic ground squirrels. They are stout, with short dense fur, which is characteristically tawny across the bridge of the nose. Social encounters sometimes are initiated with kissing behavior and the most common activity above ground is standing at attention. Residing in mountainous terrain and high plains in northern latitudes, they hibernate for 8 to 9 months of the year in burrows, which may be used for many years. They are emaciated when emerging in the spring. The Columbian ground squirrel came to the attention of the scientific community through writings produced by Lewis and Clark, while 21st century molecular genetics has more finely illuminated its ties with other close relatives.

== Description ==
The Columbian ground squirrel is one of the largest members of the genus, the largest being the Arctic ground squirrel. They have a relatively sturdy, robust build. They measure 325–410 mm (12.8–16.1 in) in length overall, with a tail measuring 80–116 mm (3.1–4.6 in). The hind feet measure 47–57 mm (1.9–2.2 in) and the ear 16–22.5 mm (0.63–0.89 in).

The hair is dense and relatively short. The facial fur is bronze across the bridge of the nose. The fur along the back, legs, and feet is a more cinnamon buff, with darker fur closer to the body. There is a pale beige to buff ring of fur around the eye. The neck fur is gray along the sides of the cheeks. The flanks may be light beige or gray. They have a darker tail, with darker underfur and some lighter beige markings above and dark to grayish white below. Molting occurs diffusely, without a clear line of delineation.

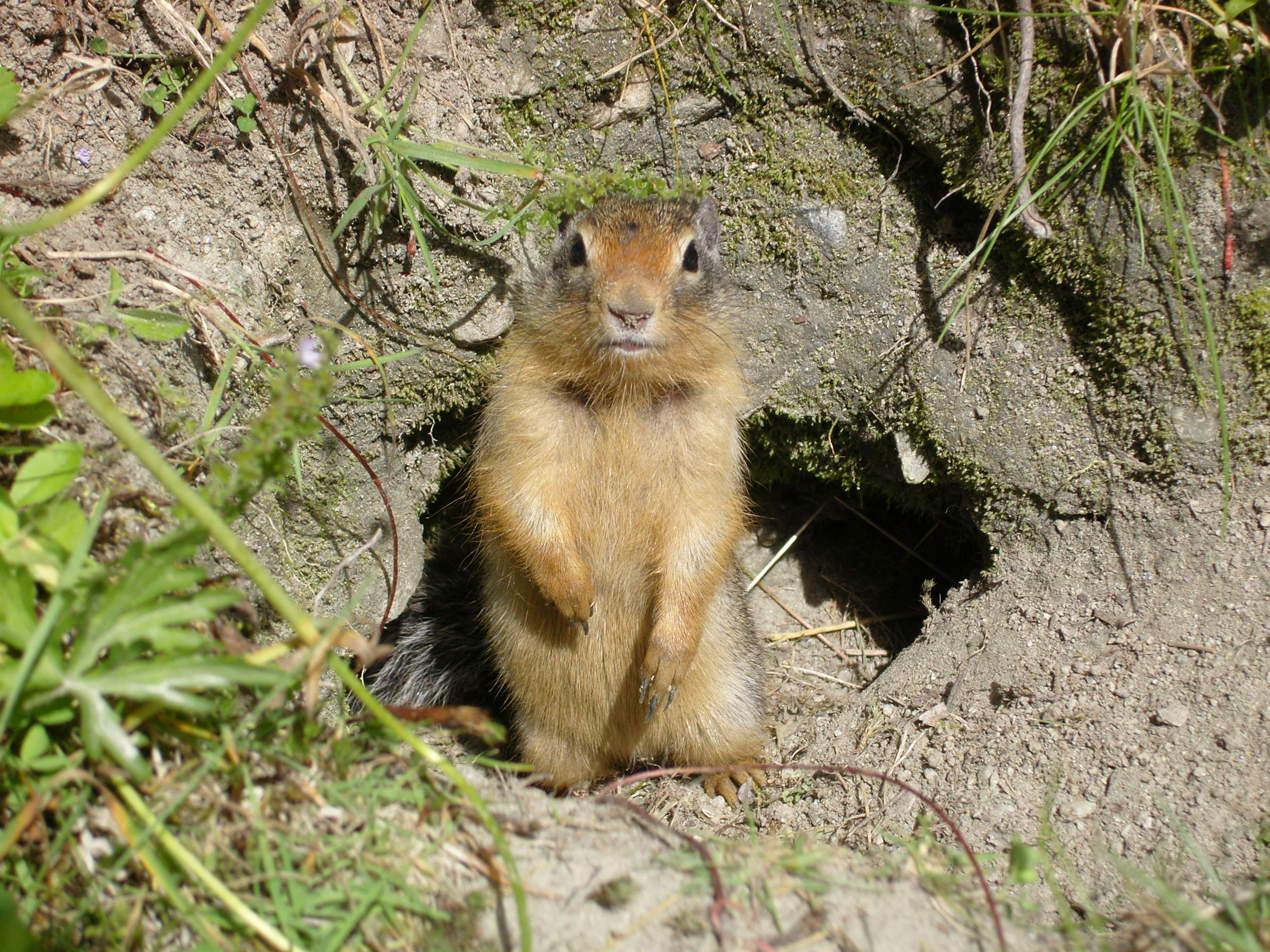
at burrow entrance

Two subspecies have been described, which vary in appearance. Compared with U. c. columbianus, the population U. c. ruficaudus has a tail more rufous and less gray above. The sides of the face and throat are also more deeply rust shaded. The legs and feet are darker as well. The skull of U. c. ruficaudus is broader, with more robust zygomatic arches.

Several albino variants have been found. An albino squirrel was captured alive by a student near Pullman, Washington in 1932. It had been in an alfalfa field. The animal had white hair and pink eyes. A zoologist reported intentions to keep the animal alive to study genetic inheritance patterns. The following year, he reported finding three more young albinos in the same area. Around 30 years prior, two albino skins had been collected, also near Pullman. It was proposed that the recessive trait persisted in the locality, appearing at sporadic intervals.

== Distribution and habitat ==
The Columbia ground squirrel is found in western areas of North America. It occurs in the Rocky Mountains, from as far north as western Alberta and southeastern British Columbia. They are found in the western parts of Montana, through central Idaho and into northern and eastern reaches of Washington. They are also found along plains of eastern Washington. In Oregon, they occur in mountainous area in the east-central part of the state. They reside between 700–8,000 feet (210–2,440 m) in elevation.

The known fossil record of the Columbia ground squirrel consists of specimens recovered from the Wasden fossil site (Owl Cave) in Bonneville County, Idaho. Fossils from this site date to the late Pleistocene (Rancholabrean). The site is located at 1,584 metres (5,197 ft) elevation. Fossils of small mammals deposited at this site are primarily attributed to owl predation.

The distribution of the Columbia ground squirrel in Oregon was assessed based on consideration of animals obtained in 71 localities. Over 98% were obtained in the Blue Mountains ecoregion, which includes the Wallowa and Blue Mountain ranges. The remaining squirrels came from the Owyheee Uplands.

== Behavior ==
burrow diagram

Columbian ground squirrels in Alberta hibernate around 250 days a year, with only 69–94 days of activity observed. The amount of time active varies depending on local climate as well as variations in behavior of animals of different sexes and ages. Each sex and age group hibernates at different soil depths and begins hibernation when the soil temperature of their hibernaculum is at its warmest. During hibernation, the squirrels are positioned vertically in a tight ball. The temperature drops significantly, the heart rate slows and respirations are scarcely perceptible. The first group to emerge is adult males, which is likely due to their need to regrow their testes for breeding, as the testes of other ground squirrels have been found to shrink in size and stop sperm production during hibernation. Adult males are followed by adult females, yearlings, then juveniles. Animals at higher elevations and latitudes emerge later. They emerge from hibernation and start breeding earlier at low elevations.

They raise one litter per year. Young are born naked, blind, and toothless. After 5–6 days, their weight has doubled. They are covered with dark silky hair by day 12. Around day 17, the eyes are beginning to open. They may emerge into the sunlight outside the den around day 21–24. After 4 weeks, they are able to leave the nest altogether.

Before their first hibernation, newborn Columbian ground squirrels only have a period of a few weeks to wean off their mother's milk. Because of this, the 27 day lactation period of the mother squirrel is the young's primary opportunity to get the nutrition necessary for surviving hibernation. The concentrations of most components of the mother's milk vary throughout the lactation period, most dramatically seen in calcium, which typically experiences a 134% increase in concentration from the beginning of lactation to its peak (~17 days postpartum).

Mammalogist Vernon Orlando Bailey examined a Columbia ground squirrel burrow at an elevation of 7,000 ft (2,100 m) near the Piegan Pass in Glacier National Park. In late July, an adult female was found bringing up fresh soil to the burrow entrance daily. The animal was removed and the burrow excavated for examination The mound at the entrance consisted of an estimated 8 US gal (0.030 m^{3}) of soil. The soil was of varying dates of accumulation, since the lower layers appeared packed from previous seasons. The burrow itself had this main opening as well as two alternates, which were concealed from external observation and likely served as avenues of escape if a predator were to enter the burrow. The main shafts of the burrow were around 3.5 in (89 mm) in diameter. Chambers were established and varying intervals throughout the burrow, possibly to allow for storage of earth being excavated or safe haven from predators. At a distance of around 8 ft (2.4 m) from the entrance, a nest had been constructed. The nest itself was made from leaves of locally abundant "glacier grass" (Luzula parviflora). Varying ages of grass were found, suggesting that the nest had been used during prior seasons. In an adjoining chamber, deeper down in the earth, an older abandoned nest, filled partially with excrement, apparently served as a toilet for the squirrel. The two types of burrow entrance were also noted by other observers, with one being small and roughly the same diameter as the tunnel itself, while another larger and more funnel shaped. The amount of soil excavated is around 4–12 kg (8.8–26.5 lb) per year, with an estimated 4–7 m (13–23 ft) of annual tunnel construction to established burrows. New burrow construction results in 25–50 kg (55–110 lb) of soil excavation.

The most common activities for Columbian ground squirrels, while above ground, include standing at attention, feeding, and grooming. More time was spent standing at attention than engaging in other activities. Aggressive behavior was observed most commonly in adult males, particularly early in the season. Columbian ground squirrel activity patterns are sensitive to climate and ambient light, avoiding cloudy days, cold winds, and inclement weather. They emerge from dens about an hour before sunrise and return near sunset. They are active during the hottest parts of the day, but more likely to be found out around mid-morning.

Columbian ground squirrels, when encountering each other, commonly will touch their mouths and noses together, an act resembling kissing. These greetings last 1–5 seconds and may precede other social interactions, including sexual activity.

C. Hart Merriam, writing in 1891, documented reports of the Columbian ground squirrel's behavior provided by local observers in Idaho. If disturbed while out of the burrow, the squirrels stood at attention, watching while approached to within a few yards, then raced for the burrow entrance, making squeaks and whistles. Locals called them "Seven sleepers", because they stayed underground for about seven months of the year. They were noted to have ample fat supplies when entering burrows to hibernate, but observed to be weak and thin when emerging the following spring. The mounds excavated by burrowing squirrels ranged from 3–10 inches (76–254 mm) in height. The burrows descended vertically from the entrance 18–24 inches (460–610 mm).

== Ecology ==
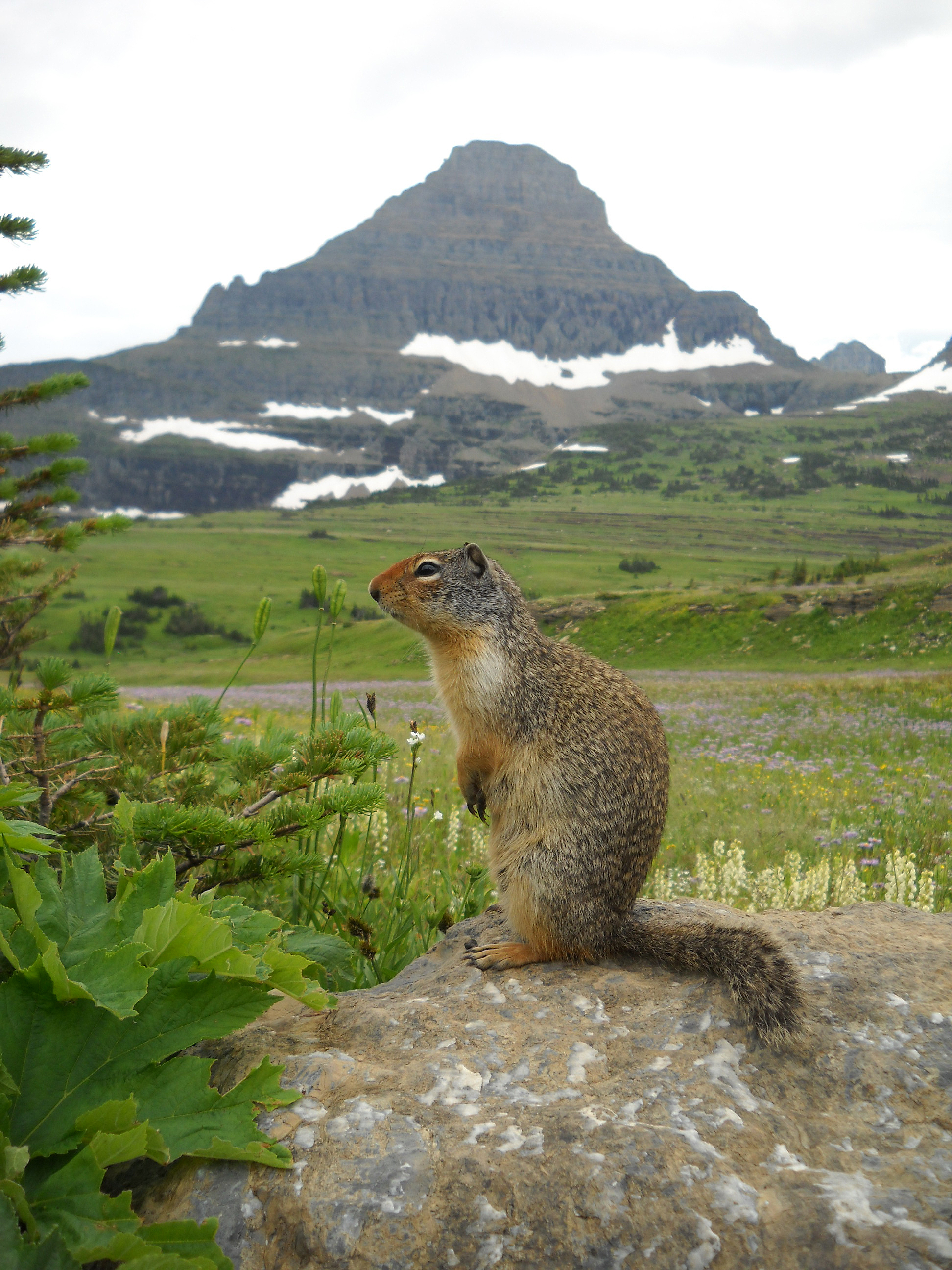
at Logan Pass

Columbian ground squirrels live in colonies distributed discontinuously throughout their range. They are found in alpine and subalpine areas, along the edges of meadows or on mounds where meadow flooding occurs. They are not found as frequently in rocky, fellfield, heather, or herbfield environments as they are in meadows and grasslands. They will occupy disturbed habitats including clear-cuts. In areas where they are sympatric with Belding's ground squirrel, they inhabit areas of higher elevation and wetter climate. Belding's ground squirrel tends towards drier, sagebrush regions. In Oregon, the Columbian ground squirrel is found primarily in the Blue Mountains, where other characteristic mammal species include: the montane shrew (Sorex monticolus), Belding's ground squirrel (Urocitellus beldingi), the American red squirrel (Tamiasciurus hudsonicus), the northern pocket gopher (Thomomys talpoides), the southern red-backed vole (Myodes gapperi), and the western jumping mouse (Zapus princeps).

Predation of other vertebrates by Columbian ground squirrels has not been described. However, cannibalism has been observed. Adult females sometimes may kill juveniles as well. It was postulated that sympatric species, including northern pocket gophers, deer mice (Peromyscus maniculatus), and meadow voles (Microtus pennsylvanicus) might use or raid provisioned burrows. Observations of possible killings of meadow voles by Columbian ground squirrels were published in 1985. These killings did not appear motivated for purposes of predation, so may have been motivated by defense of home territory and resources.

Population densities are reportedly higher in "agricultural bottomlands" compared to "wheatfields". In subalpine Idaho, the density was recorded at 35 animals per hectare. In Alberta, densities of juveniles were estimated between 5–20 per hectare, which older animal estimates were 12–16 per hectare.

They are "one of the most vegetarian of all the ground squirrels". In the early part of the season, they primarily eat succulent fresh vegetation. When the vegetation grows more tough, they are inclined to eat more grains and seeds. By the end of the season, they appear enormously fat. Examination of stomach contents from a group of 43 squirrels revealed vegetable matter in all cases. Nothing but vegetation was found in 86% of the stomachs, while 2% contained traces of other mammals and 14% contained insect remains.

Columbian ground squirrels may be parasitized by the Rocky Mountain wood tick (Dermacentor andersoni), which is a carrier for the bacteria that causes Rocky Mountain spotted fever. Other external parasites include the lice Enderleinellus suturalis and Neohaemotopinus laeviusculus; the fleas Neopsylla inopina, Opisocrostis tuberculatus, and Oropsylla idahoensis; the mites Dermacarus heptneri, Androlaelaps fahrenholz, Macrocheles sp., and Pygmephorus erlangensis. Internal parasites include Trypanosoma species Trypanosoma otospermophili, and the Eimeria species: Eimeria bilamellata, Eimeria callospermophili, and Eimeria lateralis. Instances of presence of Yersinia pestis, the cause of the black plague, have been reported. They may be a reservoir for Powassan or St Louis encephalitis virus, based on some antibody screening analyses. Columbian ground squirrels may also suffer dermatitis from Dermatophilus congolensis.

Treatment of female Columbian ground squirrels with flea powder resulted in an improved condition of treated animals. Litters produced by treated females were larger. The treated females were gained mass between the time the young were born, through weaning. Untreated cohorts, on the other hand, lost mass over this time frame.

Predators of the Colombian ground squirrel include the grizzly bear (Ursus arctos horribilis), coyote (Canis latrans), Pacific marten (Martes caurina), grey wolf (Canis lupus) American badger (Taxidea taxus), weasels (Mustela and Neogale sp.), and mountain lion (Puma concolor). Predatory birds include the golden eagle (Aquila chrysaetos), red-tailed hawk (Buteo jamaicensis), and goshawk (Accipiter gentilis).

== Taxonomy ==
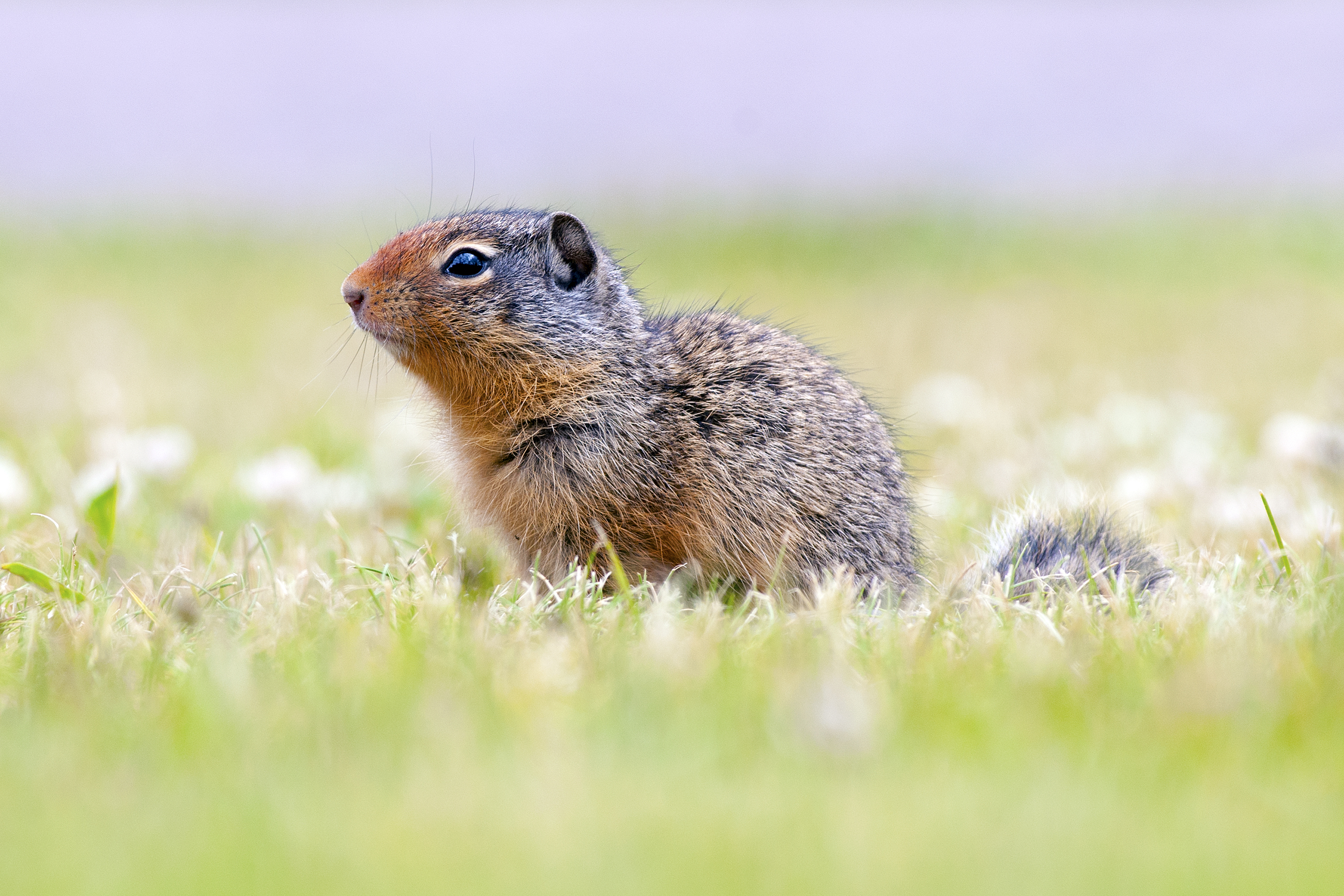
in Glacier National Park

In 1891, Merriam published an account of the mammals of Idaho, based on an expedition. He concluded that the Columbian ground squirrel is the same animal as the "Burrowing Squirrel" reported by Lewis and Clark. At the time, that animal had been thought to be the prairie dog. However, Merriam's assessment was that this was not the case and the animal described by Lewis and Clark was the same as an animal described by naturalist John Richardson in 1829. Richardson described it as a variant of the Arctic ground squirrel, obtained from the Rocky Mountains near the source of the Elk River. Merriam knew of the presence of the squirrel, but his party was there late in the season and no squirrels were directly observed in the field. However, Merriam reported that he was able to obtain "a fine series of specimens" from near Moscow, within about 40 metres (0.040 km) from the locale where Lewis and Clark's obtained their specimens. Other were obtained from a site even closer. Based on his observations and comparison with the notes of Lewis and Clark, Merriam assessed that the Columbian ground squirrel was not a variant of the Arctic ground squirrel, but a separate species, which he named as Spermophilus columbianus, rejecting the genus designation Arctomys and reapplying the species designation originally applied by Ord in 1815.

Two subspecies are described. The first, Spermophilus columbianus columbianus is the type described by Ord in 1815. The specimen type was taken "between the forks of the Clearwater and Kooskooskie rivers", in Idaho. Spermophilus columbianus albertae, described in 1903 by Joel Asaph Allen, is a synonym. Another synonymous designation, Anisonyx brachiura, was applied by Rafinesque in 1817. The third synonym, Spermophilus columbianus erythrogluteia, was the animal designated by Richardson in 1829.

The second subspecies, Spermophilus columbianus ruficaudus was described in 1928 by Arthur H. Howell. The type was taken near Wallowa Lake in northeastern Oregon.

They have also been referred to as the burrowing squirrel.

Below is a cladogram of ground squirrels (tribe Marmotini) derived from maximum parsimony analysis.

- - - Notocitellus
      - N. adocetus
      - N. annulatus
    - Ammospermophilus
      - A. harrisii
      - - A. leucurus
        - - A. harrisii
          - A. interpres
  - - - Otospermophilus
        - - O. atricapillus
          - O. beecheyi
        - O. variegatus
      - Callospermophilus
        - C. saturatus
        - - C. lateralis
          - C. madrensis
    - - Marmota
        - M. monax
        - M. marmota
        - - M. flaviventris
          - - M. caligata
            - - M. olympus
              - M. vancouveriensis
        - - - M. broweri
            - - M. menzbieri
              - M. caudata
          - - - M. baibacina
              - M. bobak
            - - M. camtschatica
              - - M. himalayana
                - M. sibirica
- - Spermophilus
    - - S. musicus
      - - S. pygmaeus
        - - S. major
          - S. pygmaeus
    - - - - S. dauricus
          - S. xanthopyrmnus
        - S. suslicus
      - - S. citellus
        - - S. relictus
          - - S. erythrogenys
            - - S. citellus
              - - S. pallidicauda
                - - S. fulvus
                  - - S. erythrogenys
                    - S. major
  - - - Ictidomys
        - I. mexicanus
        - - I. parvidens
          - I. tridecemlineatus
      - - Poliocitellus
          P. franklinii
        - - Cynomys
            - - C. ludovicianus
              - C. mexicanus
            - - C. parvidens
              - - C. gunnisoni
                - C. leucurus
          - Xerospermophilus
            - - X. mohavensis
              - X. tereticaudus
            - - X. spilosoma
              - - X. perotensis
                - X. spilosoma
    - Urocitellus
      - U. townsendii
      - - U. washingtonii
        - - - U. brunnenus
            - - U. townsendii
              - - U. mollis
                - U. townsendii
          - - - U. armatus
              - U. beldingi
            - - U. columbianus
              - - U. undulatus
                - - U. parryii
                  - - U. elegans
                    - U. richardsonii
                  - U. parryii

== Human interactions ==
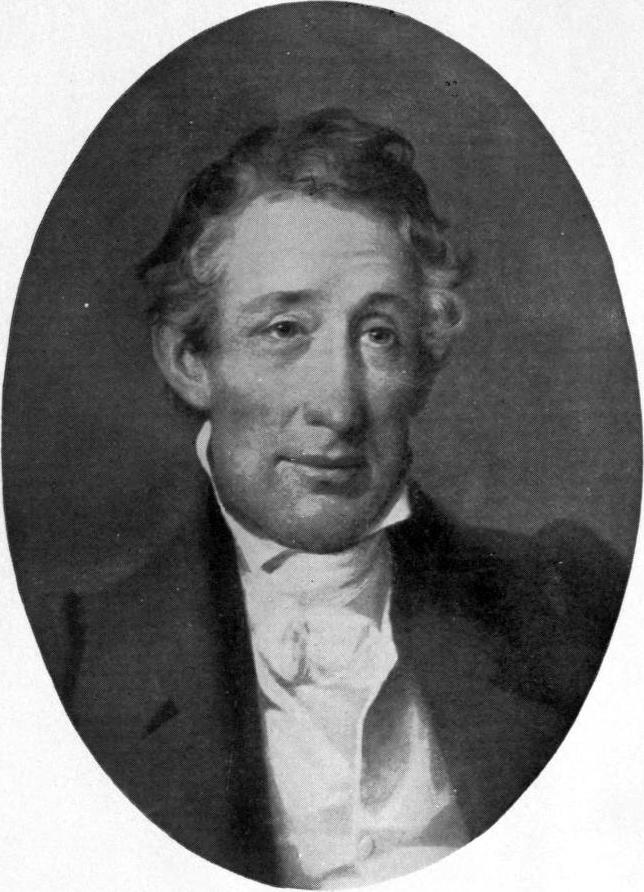
Ornithologist George Ord published the first scientific description of the Columbia ground squirrel

With the advent of intensive agricultural practices in their range, Columbian ground squirrels came to be seen as pests, negatively impacting harvests of wheat and other crops. In 1910, the Washington Agricultural Experiment Station began a comprehensive study in a location known as the Citellary (named after the contemporary genus name of the animal Citellus). The Citellary was composed of yards that enclosed natural squirrel dens and was 50 by 90 feet, surrounded by a fence. Associated cabins were used for the study of brooding and hibernating animals. This provided conditions to closely observe them in a near natural setting.

=== Conservation status ===
The IUCN lists the Columbian ground squirrel as a species of least concern. The reason for this listing is that the animal is widespread and common in its range and no major threats to the survival of the species are identified. Population trends are listed as stable. Similarly, the state of Montana, considers Columbian ground squirrels an important part of the state's ecosystem, noting that the animals are abundant with a wide spread distribution and are not vulnerable through most of their range.
