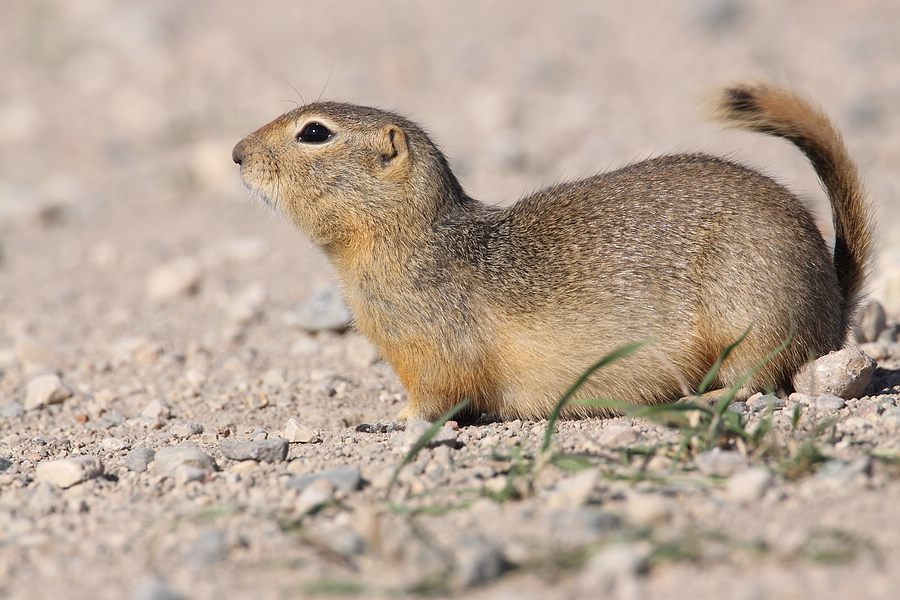
- Richardson's ground squirrel in Manitoba

Scientific classification
- Domain: Eukaryota
- Kingdom: Animalia
- Phylum: Chordata
- Class: Mammalia
- Order: Rodentia
- Family: Sciuridae
- Tribe: Marmotini
- Genus: Urocitellus; Obolenskij, 1927

Type species
- Spermophilus eversmanni Brandt, 1842 (= Mus citillus undulata Pallas, 1779)

Species
- See text.

= Urocitellus =

Genus of rodents

Urocitellus is a genus of ground squirrels. They were previously believed to belong to the much larger genus Spermophilus, but DNA sequencing of the cytochrome b gene showed that this group was paraphyletic to the prairie dogs and marmots, and could therefore no longer be retained as a single genus. As a result, Urocitellus is now considered as a genus in its own right.

All but two species are native to the northern and western parts of North America, from California and Minnesota through the north-western United States and western Canada; the Arctic ground squirrel inhabits Arctic terrain on both sides of the Bering Strait, while the long-tailed ground squirrel is exclusively found in Asia. The name of the genus is said to be derived from the Latin uro, meaning "tail" and citellus for "ground squirrel". The proper word for "tail" in classical Latin is cauda. Oura (οὐρά) is the ancient Greek word for "tail".

== Species ==
Fourteen species are currently identified:

Genus Urocitellus

- Uinta ground squirrel, Urocitellus armatus
- Belding's ground squirrel, Urocitellus beldingi
- Northern Idaho ground squirrel, Urocitellus brunneus
- Merriam's ground squirrel, Urocitellus canus
- Columbian ground squirrel, Urocitellus columbianus
- Wyoming ground squirrel, Urocitellus elegans
- Southern Idaho ground squirrel, Urocitellus endemicus
- Piute ground squirrel, Urocitellus mollis
- Arctic ground squirrel, Urocitellus parryii
- Richardson's ground squirrel, Urocitellus richardsonii
- Snake River Plains ground squirrel, Urocitellus idahoensis
- Townsend's ground squirrel, Urocitellus townsendii
- Long-tailed ground squirrel, Urocitellus undulatus
- Washington ground squirrel, Urocitellus washingtoni
