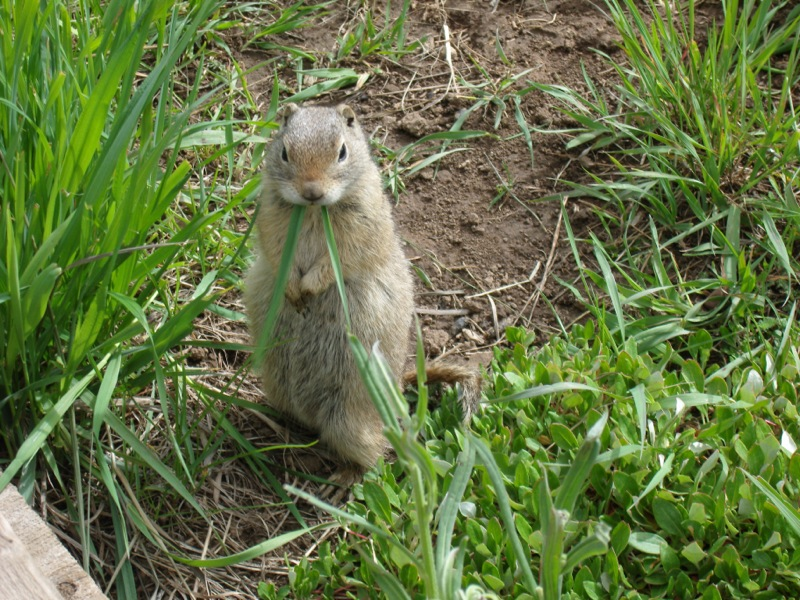

Conservation status
- Least Concern (IUCN 3.1)

Scientific classification
- Kingdom: Animalia
- Phylum: Chordata
- Class: Mammalia
- Order: Rodentia
- Family: Sciuridae
- Genus: Urocitellus
- Species: U. elegans

Binomial name
- Urocitellus elegans (Kennicott, 1863)

Subspecies
- U. e. aureus; U. e. elegans; U. e. nevadensis

Synonyms
- Citellus elegans Kennicott, 1863; Citellus kimballensis Kent, 1967; Spermophilus elegans Kennicott, 1863; Spermophilus richardsonii elegans Kennicott, 1863

= Wyoming ground squirrel =

Wyoming ground squirrel Urocitellus elegans Temporal range: 1.8–0 Ma

Species of rodent

The Wyoming ground squirrel (Urocitellus elegans) is a species of rodent in the family Sciuridae. It is endemic to the mountain west of the United States.

== Description ==
The Wyoming ground squirrel is a moderately sized ground squirrel with adults ranging from 25.3 centimetres (10.0 in) to 30.7 centimetres (12.1 in). It is a big-eared Urocitellus species with a relatively long tail. Its upperparts are light drab, with specks of pink, clay, or cinnamon. The tail is edged with light buff or white and its underside is clay-colored or light brown.

In Montana, western Wyoming, and extreme northeastern Utah the Wyoming ground squirrel co-occurs with the Uinta ground squirrel. The Wyoming ground squirrel can be distinguished by the buff underside of its tail, which is gray in the Uinta. In this zone of sympatry the Wyoming ground squirrel displays character displacement and these populations are smaller and paler.

== Distribution and Habitat ==
The Wyoming ground squirrel occurs in three disjunctive populations, each representing a different subspecies.

U. e. aureus is found in southwestern Montana and adjacent Idaho where it occurs in valley bottoms and foothills. Throughout its range, higher elevation montane meadows are occupied by the Uinta ground squirrel, limiting the elevational range of this subspecies.

U. e. elegans occurs from southern Wyoming to south-central Colorado. It reaches as far west as extreme northeastern Utah and as far east as extreme western Nebraska. It may be found in a wide range of open habitats between 1,500 metres (4,900 ft) and tree line, including sagebrush plains, grasslands, and montane meadows. In forests, it requires openings of only a few acres to establish. Since the early 20th century, the Wyoming ground squirrel has undergone significant southward range expansion in Colorado due to a lack of natural barriers, favorable vegetation, an absence of competitors, and a willingness to use burrows constructed by other species. Anthropogenic modifications to its ecosystems, including livestock grazing and prairie dog poisoning, may have further facilitated its expansion.

U. e. nevadensis occurs in the Great Basin and can be found in north-central Nevada. Historically, its range included southeastern Oregon and southwestern Idaho, but it may now be extirpated from those states.

== Behavior ==
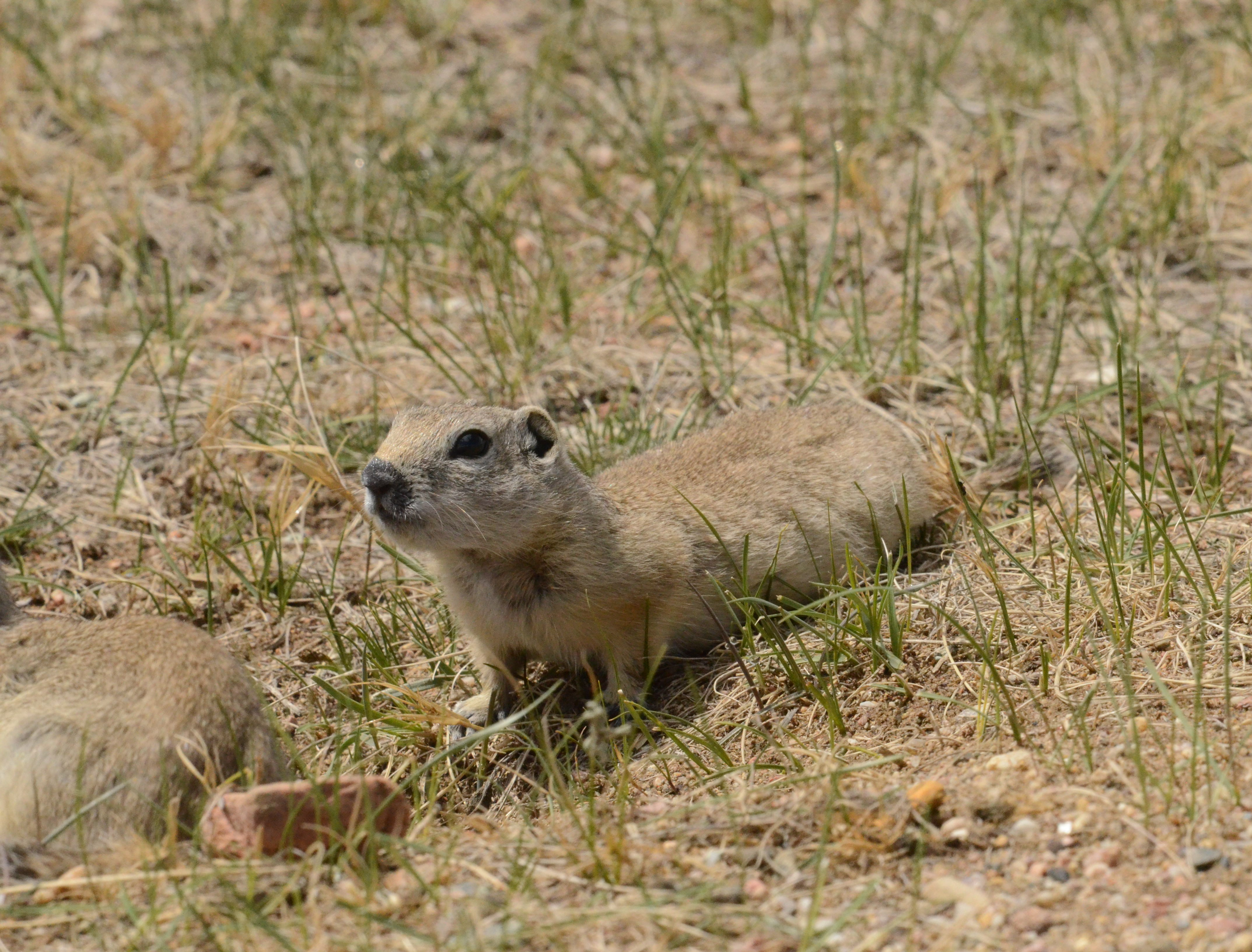
Wyoming ground squirrel in a down-coiled alert posture, characterized by an upright head, trunk pressed to the ground, and limbs flexed beneath the body.

Wyoming ground squirrels live in fossorial colonies. While ground squirrels may live in close contact with one another, each den is typically occupied by a single individual.

The Wyoming ground squirrel hibernates for much of the year. Males emerge from the burrows first, appearing above ground in late March or early April with females emerging 1 to 2 weeks later. Adults begin hibernation by late July while juveniles stay above ground as late as September. Reproductive activity begins in April. Courtship includes naso-nasal contact, sniffing, nibbling, and nuzzling. Copulation occurs within the burrow. Adult males occupy territories during the breeding season while females occupy territories throughout gestation and lactation.

Adult male ground squirrels disperse in April while juvenile males disperse in August.

During spring and early summer, Wyoming ground squirrel activity peaks in the early afternoon. By late summer, activity develops a bimodal distribution to avoid the midday heat.

In response to perceived risks, Wyoming ground squirrels assume an alert position in which the body is rigid, allowing for observation and rapid escape. Ground squirrels living close to prairie dog colonies will respond to the warning calls of prairie dogs.

== Ecology ==
Wyoming ground squirrels are predated by terrestrial predators, including foxes, coyotes, American badgers, weasels, and rattlesnakes, as well as avian predators including red-tailed hawks and American goshawks. Occasional sylvatic plague outbreaks can cause considerable ground squirrel mortality.

Wyoming ground squirrels will engage in antagonistic behavior against other ground squirrels and tend to exclude the golden-mantled ground squirrel from meadows it occupies.

Due to forage competition with livestock and disease risk to humans, the Wyoming ground squirrel is often the subject of population controls which typically occur through shooting or sodium monofluoroacetate poisoning.
