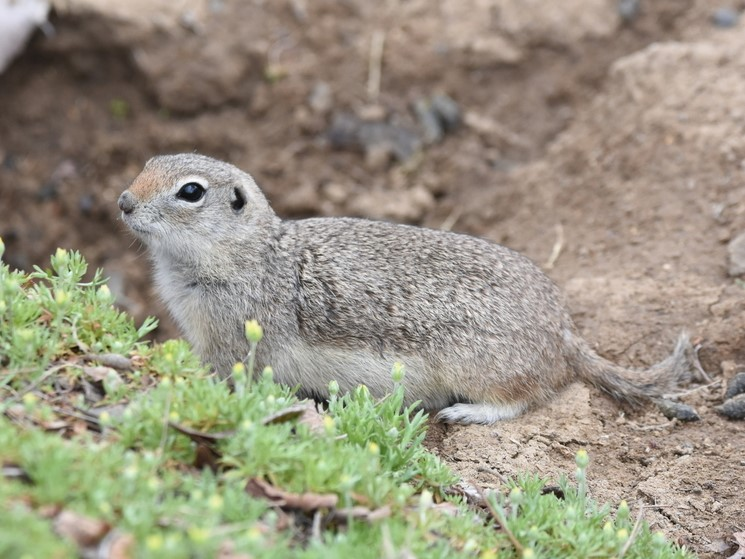

Conservation status
- Least Concern (IUCN 3.1)

Scientific classification
- Kingdom: Animalia
- Phylum: Chordata
- Class: Mammalia
- Order: Rodentia
- Family: Sciuridae
- Genus: Urocitellus
- Species: U. canus

Binomial name
- Urocitellus canus (Merriam, 1898)

Synonyms
- Spermophilus canus Merriam, 1898; Spermophilus vigilis Merriam, 1913

= Merriam's ground squirrel =

Species of rodent

Merriam's ground squirrel (Urocitellus canus) is a species of rodent in the family Sciuridae. It occurs in the western United States in Idaho, Nevada, and Oregon.

== Description ==
Merriam's ground squirrel is a small, grey, ground squirrel with a relatively nondescript appearance. Adults range from 18.8 to 21.8 centimetres (7.4 to 8.6 in) in head-body length, with a 3.1 to 5.0 centimetres (1.2 to 2.0 in) tail. Although their weight varies throughout the year, depending on nutrition, typical adult weights of 144 to 210 grams (5.1 to 7.4 oz) have been recorded for females, and 146 to 300 grams (5.1 to 10.6 oz) for males.

The fur is short and lacks any distinctive markings such as stripes or spots. It is greyish buff over most of the body, and pale buff to white on the underparts. The tail is relatively short and narrow compared with most other related ground squirrels, and the ears are small. However, it can only be reliably distinguished from Townsend's ground squirrel and the Piute ground squirrel by genetic testing, and, for a long time, these species were not considered to be separate.

== Distribution and habitat ==
The species is found throughout much of Oregon, although not in the northern and western regions of the state. Some populations extend south of the state line into the extreme north-eastern corner of California and the extreme north-western corner of Nevada, while other populations extend along the west bank of the Snake River into western Idaho.

Two subspecies are generally recognised:

- Urocitellus canus canus - Oregon, California, Nevada
- Urocitellus canus vigilis - Snake River region (eastern Oregon, western Idaho)

The native habitat of Merriam's ground squirrel is arid chaparral environments dominated by sagebrush, and, to a lesser extent, by greasewood and shadscale. It is sometimes found in marginal juniper woodland and can be common in man-made pasture and fields.

== Behavior ==
Merriam's ground squirrel is a diurnal omnivore, feeding on a wide range of seeds, roots, and bulbs, as well as on insects, such as cicadas. Although relatively little of its native habitat has been converted into farmland, where it does inhabit agricultural land, it may eat domesticated grains or alfalfa, and be considered as a pest. Known predators include barn owls and great horned owls, and presumably also include hawks, snakes, and various carnivorous mammals.

They construct burrows, and rarely wander far from their entrances, typically having a home range of less than 1 hectare (2 acres). They spend most of the year hibernating; although there is some variation with local habitat, they generally emerge in early March, and become dormant again in early August. They give birth to a single litter of up to ten young each year in late April or early May. The gestation period and duration of weaning are unknown, but are probably each in the range of three to four weeks.

They are quiet and secretive animals, with a shrill, squeaking, alarm call, and have been observed to climb low bushes in search of food and to be good swimmers.
