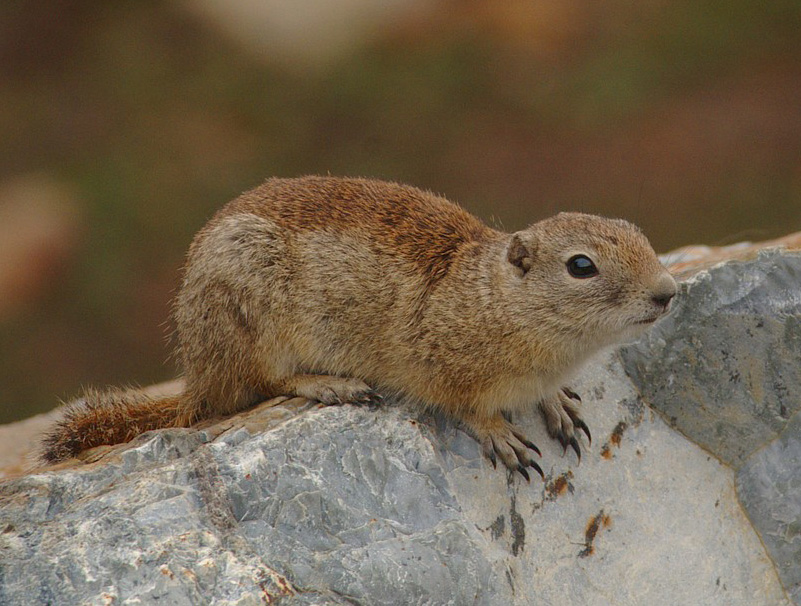

Conservation status
- Least Concern (IUCN 3.1)

Scientific classification
- Kingdom: Animalia
- Phylum: Chordata
- Class: Mammalia
- Order: Rodentia
- Family: Sciuridae
- Genus: Urocitellus
- Species: U. beldingi

Binomial name
- Urocitellus beldingi (Merriam, 1888)
- Distribution of the Belding's ground squirrel

Synonyms
- Spermophilus beldingi Merriam, 1888

= Belding's ground squirrel =

Species of rodent

Belding's ground squirrel (Urocitellus beldingi), also called pot gut, sage rat or picket-pin, is a squirrel that lives on mountains in the western United States. In California, it often is found at 6,500 to 11,800 feet (2,000–3,600 m) in meadows between Lake Tahoe and Kings Canyon. This species is not of conservation concern, and its range includes some protected areas.

== Physical description ==
The Belding's ground squirrel is medium-sized with "a relatively short tail, short limbs, and small ears". It has a gray pelage that becomes more cinnamon at the underside and reddish-brown on the back. Its body length is 230 to 300 millimetres (9.1–11.8 in). The tail is 44 to 76 millimetres (1.7–3.0 in) and is bushy but also flattened. The distal hairs of the tail have three color bands, one black, one white, and one red. On average, the ground squirrel weighs 290 grams (0.64 lb). Its feet are covered in little to no hair. Compared to other ground squirrel species, its cheek pouches are moderate in size.

== Ecology ==
=== Range and habitat ===
Being native to the northwestern United States, the Belding's ground squirrel ranges covers northeastern Oregon and part of Washington, north California, southwestern Idaho, north and central Nevada and northwestern Utah. These animals are most abundant at higher altitudes, occurring in alpine and subalpine meadows. They also inhabit sagebrush flats, brush/grass habitats and cultivated areas at lower elevations. The grounds squirrels are largely restricted to open areas with enough fresh vegetation and water. They do not live in dense forests, tall grasses, rocky slopes, or thick shrubbery, as they cannot watch for predators. In addition, they do not prefer grass that is too short, as they cannot hide from predators.

=== Food and feeding ===
Belding's ground squirrels have a largely herbivorous diet. However, they will also eat insects, carrion, other vertebrates, and even other ground squirrels. They mostly eat flowers and seeds. They also eat nuts, grains, roots, bulbs, mushrooms, and green vegetation. Belding's ground squirrels do not keep food in caches. Instead, they store fat reserves. As such, the ground squirrels eat large quantities of food before hibernation, doubling their body weight. They spend as much as 40% of the summer eating. When eating, the ground squirrel feeds itself with its front paws while standing on its back paws.

=== Hibernation ===
Belding's ground squirrels hibernate at different times, depending on the sex and age of the individual and the altitude of their environment. Adult males go into hibernation between late July and early September when at higher altitudes. Females may follow them in late September, depending on the elevation. Juveniles follow their parent into hibernation, with juvenile females first going when they are 13 weeks old and males when they are 10 weeks old. They enter when the grasses begin to dry and turn brown, thus avoiding the hot, dry, late-summer famine.

The ground squirrels hibernate in burrow chambers called hibernacula. Males hibernate alone while females tend to hibernate together. The time in which ground squirrel emerge from their hibernation also depends on different factors. At lower elevations, males emerge relatively synchronously in February, while at higher elevations, they emerge at the end of April. Females emerge later than males, and their emergence is spread over several weeks.

=== Activity cycles ===
Belding's ground squirrels begin to leave their burrows at sunrise. They are most active in the morning (e.g., feeding, digging, and interacting socially). They warm themselves by stretching out on rocks or on the warm ground. Their activities tend to decrease as the temperature increases. They typically reenter their burrows in mid-afternoon, reemerge in late-afternoon, and submerge for the night at sunset. Juveniles emerge and submerge later than adults.

=== Demography ===
The demography of a free-living population at Tioga Pass, California was studied using mark-recapture techniques over 11 consecutive field seasons. Results indicated that the 7—8 month hibernation period (October—May) is the most hazardous time, when 66 to 70% of juveniles and 36 to 39% of adults disappear. Late season snowstorms can also greatly increase mortality, especially among females Males that survived their first winter were recaptured for an additional 1.1 years vs. 1.6 years for females. In general, females live twice as long as males. Few males lived more than 6 years, whereas some females lived more than 11 years; as a result the sex of ratio of the adult population was female—biased, especially among the older population.

== Behavior ==
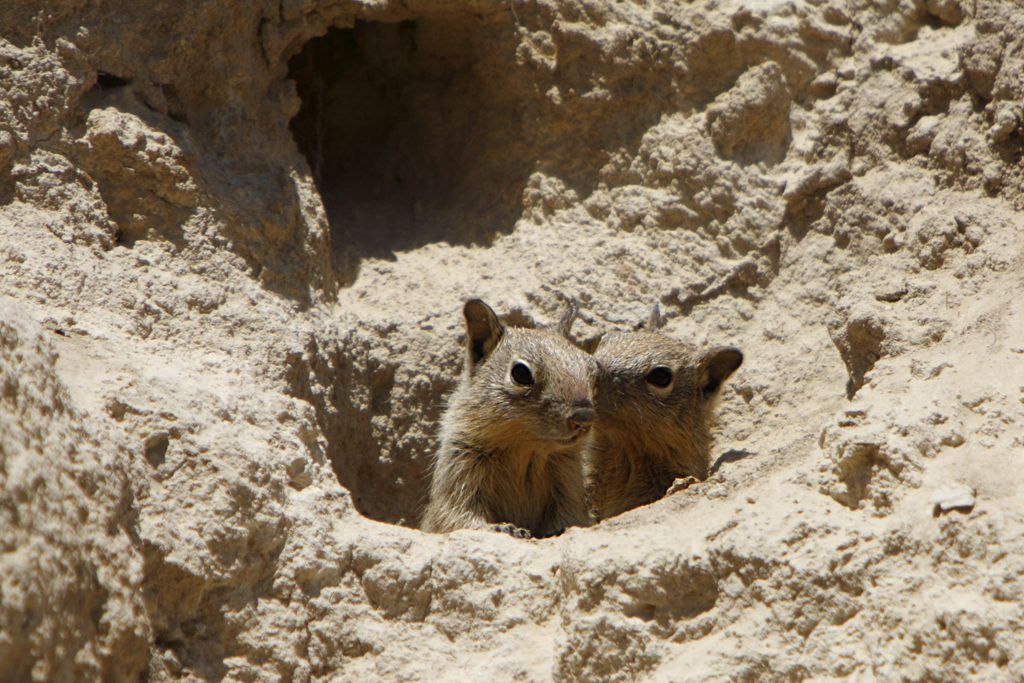
Pups

=== Family relations ===
Belding's ground squirrels live in a nepotistic society where most interactions occur between females, their offspring, and collateral kin. Females are philopatric, and spend their lives in the area where they were born, whereas males begin dispersing 2 months after weaning and the following spring, and they never return to their natal area. Females cooperate to defend territories, protect pups from infanticide, share feeding areas, and give alarm calls when predators approach. Cooperation between females correlates with their degree of relatedness. Ground squirrels recognize their kin by comparing their own odor phenotypes and those of littermates with odors of squirrels they encounter. These phenotypes come in the form of scent from dorsal and anal glands that leave a "pungent" odor in the dust bathing areas. Each animal has its own repertoire of scents that others can use to recognize it. If an individual's odor phenotype matches itself or its littermates closely enough, it is likely a relative. Laboratory tests indicate that females can discriminate between relatives and nonrelatives, and close and distant kin, including paternal half-siblings that were born in different litters. Field observations indicate that females favor close kin more than distant kin, and behave aggressively toward nonrelatives. Adult males do not display kin recognition, nor nepotistic behaviors.

=== Alarm calls ===
Belding's ground squirrels are preyed on by various mammals (e.g., coyotes, badgers, and weasels) and birds (e.g., red-tailed and rough-legged hawks). Ground squirrels also perceive humans, livestock, and cars as threats. Belding's ground squirrels respond to predators by giving two distinct types of alarm calls. The first, known as the churr call or the trill, is made as a series of 5 or more notes, given rapidly. These calls are given for predators that pose less immediate threats, usually terrestrial predators. After sighting terrestrial predators, nearby ground squirrels do not call until they make it to safety whereas animals that are farther away seek a convenient vantage point (a rock or dirt mound) where the alarm callers stand on their hind legs (posting), to get a better view and keep track of the predator.

The second alarm call, known as the whistle, is made as a single high-pitched note. This call is made in response to immediate threats, usually aerial ones. All individuals in hearing range will exhibit evasive behavior such as crouching or, more commonly, fleeing into the nearest shelter. When escaping from aerial predators, squirrels call while they are running. In addition, with aerial predators, males and females will call whereas with terrestrial predators only females with kin give alarm calls. The implication is that trills function to warn kin of impending danger (nepotism), whereas whistles benefit the callers themselves. By sounding the alarm, callers signal that a predator is rapidly approaching. Listeners to rush for shelter, calling as they go, thereby creating predator-confusing pandemonium due to the sudden appearance of a group of running, vocalizing animals. This may reduce the likelihood that any one individual caller will be caught.

=== Reproduction and parenting ===
For Belding's ground squirrels mating occurs 2–3 weeks after emergence from hibernation, usually in late May to early June at higher elevations. The ground squirrels mate promiscuously, as both males and females mate with multiple partners. Females are sexually receptive for less than five hours each year. Thus when a female is receptive, the males immediately gather around her. They will fight viciously to gain access, grappling, kicking, scratching, and biting each other. Larger, older, and stronger males are more likely to mate. A single female can mate with as many as five different males during her brief receptive period. A female's first mate generally sires the majority of her litter. Multiple mating increases the likelihood of pregnancy and also increases genetic diversity within litters.

Females give birth to one litter a year. Pregnant females will dig nesting burrows and gather grass and grass roots to make nests. Nesting-only territories are established around these burrows. Females protect the burrows against intruding unrelated conspecifics by attacking and chasing them. Defense of the territories lasts until the young are weaned. The gestation period of this ground squirrel lasts 23–31 days and young are born in late June to early July at higher elevations. At lower elevations, such as Central Oregon, young are born in March Litter sizes range from 3–8 young. Litter sizes and reproductive values change with female age, being lowest for young (1 yr) and old (5—9 yr) females and highest for 2 to 4 olds.

Females rear young without assistance from males. In their first few weeks of life, pups inhabit their mother's subterranean nest burrow. Pups first emerge from their natal burrows at weaning, when they are about 27 days old: at Tioga Pass, in July and early August, in central Oregon in mid- to late-April. The young remain near the entrance to their natal burrow for several days, and then start to explore more widely. Young males foray farther than females, and males begin dispersing before the end of their first summer. Infanticide occurs frequently in Belding's ground squirrels. An intruding squirrel will drag a squealing, squirming juvenile out of the nest burrow, and promptly kill it by biting its head. The killer will also sometimes eat the carcass. Adult females and yearling males are more often the killers. The perpetrators of infanticide do not reside in the same area as the victim. Females never kill their relatives and they will help their kin in protecting their young from infanticide.

== Taxonomy ==
Belding's ground squirrel was first described by Clinton Hart Merriam in 1888, as Spermophilus beldingi. Three subspecies are now generally recognized:

- U. b. beldingi (Merriam, 1888)
- U. b. creber Hall, 1940
- U. b. oregonus (Merriam, 1898)
