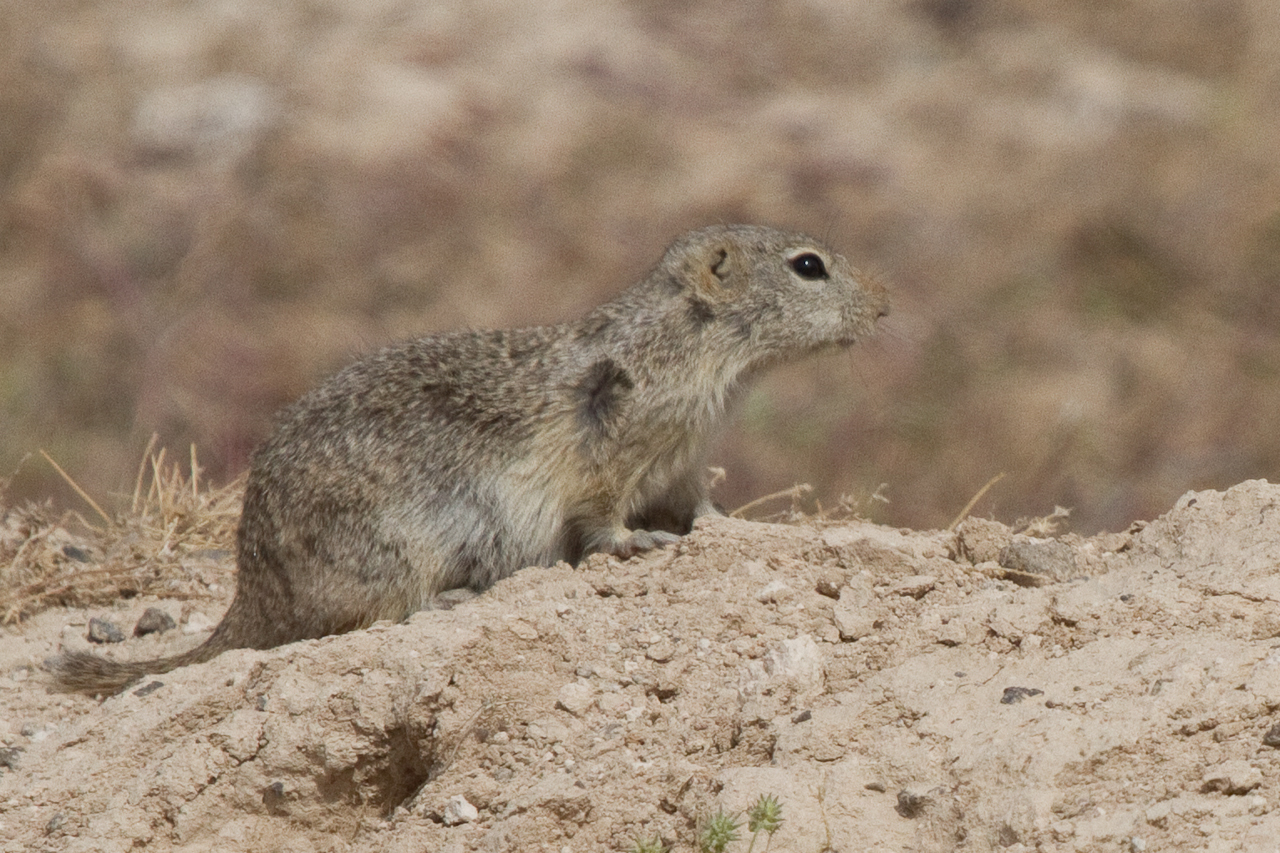

Conservation status
- Least Concern (IUCN 3.1)

Scientific classification
- Kingdom: Animalia
- Phylum: Chordata
- Class: Mammalia
- Order: Rodentia
- Family: Sciuridae
- Genus: Urocitellus
- Species: U. mollis

Binomial name
- Urocitellus mollis (Kennicott, 1863)

Synonyms
- Spermophilus mollis Kennicott, 1863

= Piute ground squirrel =

Species of rodent

The Piute ground squirrel (Urocitellus mollis) is a species of rodent in the family Sciuridae. It is endemic to the Great Basin region of the western United States, where it is found in parts of California, Idaho, Nevada, Oregon, Utah, and Washington.
