= List of mammals of Lesotho =

This is a list of the mammal species recorded in Lesotho. There are sixty mammal species in Lesotho, of which one is endangered, two are vulnerable, and one is near threatened.

The following tags are used to highlight each species' conservation status as assessed by the International Union for Conservation of Nature:

EX	Extinct	No reasonable doubt that the last individual has died.
EW	Extinct in the wild	Known only to survive in captivity or as a naturalized populations well outside its previous range.
CR	Critically endangered	The species is in imminent risk of extinction in the wild.
EN	Endangered	The species is facing an extremely high risk of extinction in the wild.
VU	Vulnerable	The species is facing a high risk of extinction in the wild.
NT	Near threatened	The species does not meet any of the criteria that would categorise it as risking extinction but it is likely to do so in the future.
LC	Least concern	There are no current identifiable risks to the species.
DD	Data deficient	There is inadequate information to make an assessment of the risks to this species.

Some species were assessed using an earlier set of criteria. Species assessed using this system have the following instead of near threatened and least concern categories:

LR/cd	Lower risk/conservation dependent	Species which were the focus of conservation programmes and may have moved into a higher risk category if that programme was discontinued.
LR/nt	Lower risk/near threatened	Species which are close to being classified as vulnerable but are not the subject of conservation programmes.
LR/lc	Lower risk/least concern	Species for which there are no identifiable risks.

== Order: Afrosoricida (tenrecs and golden moles) ==
The order Afrosoricida contains the golden moles of southern Africa and the tenrecs of Madagascar and Africa, two families of small mammals that were traditionally part of the order Insectivora.

- Family: Chrysochloridae
  - Subfamily: Chrysochlorinae
    - Genus: Chlorotalpa
      - Sclater's golden mole, Chlorotalpa sclateri LC
  - Subfamily: Amblysominae
    - Genus: Amblysomus
      - Hottentot golden mole, Amblysomus hottentotus LC

== Order: Hyracoidea (hyraxes) ==
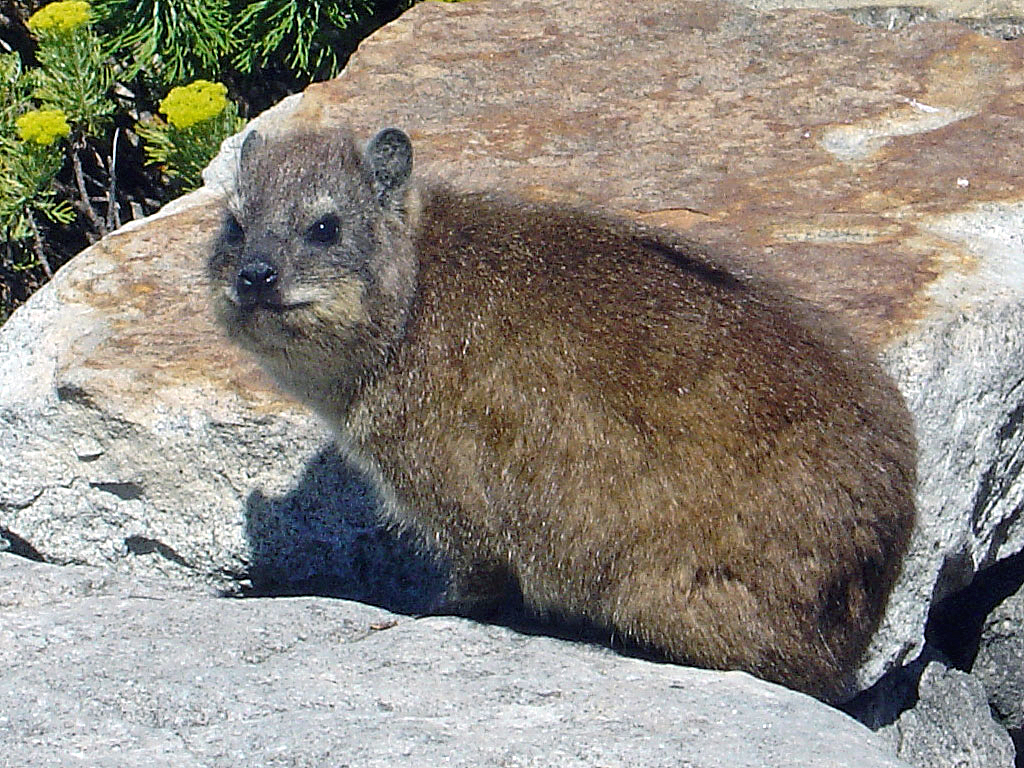
Cape hyrax

The hyraxes are any of four species of fairly small, thickset, herbivorous mammals in the order Hyracoidea. About the size of a domestic cat they are well-furred, with rounded bodies and a stumpy tail. They are native to Africa and the Middle East.

- Family: Procaviidae (hyraxes)
  - Genus: Procavia
    - Cape hyrax, Procavia capensis LC

== Order: Primates ==
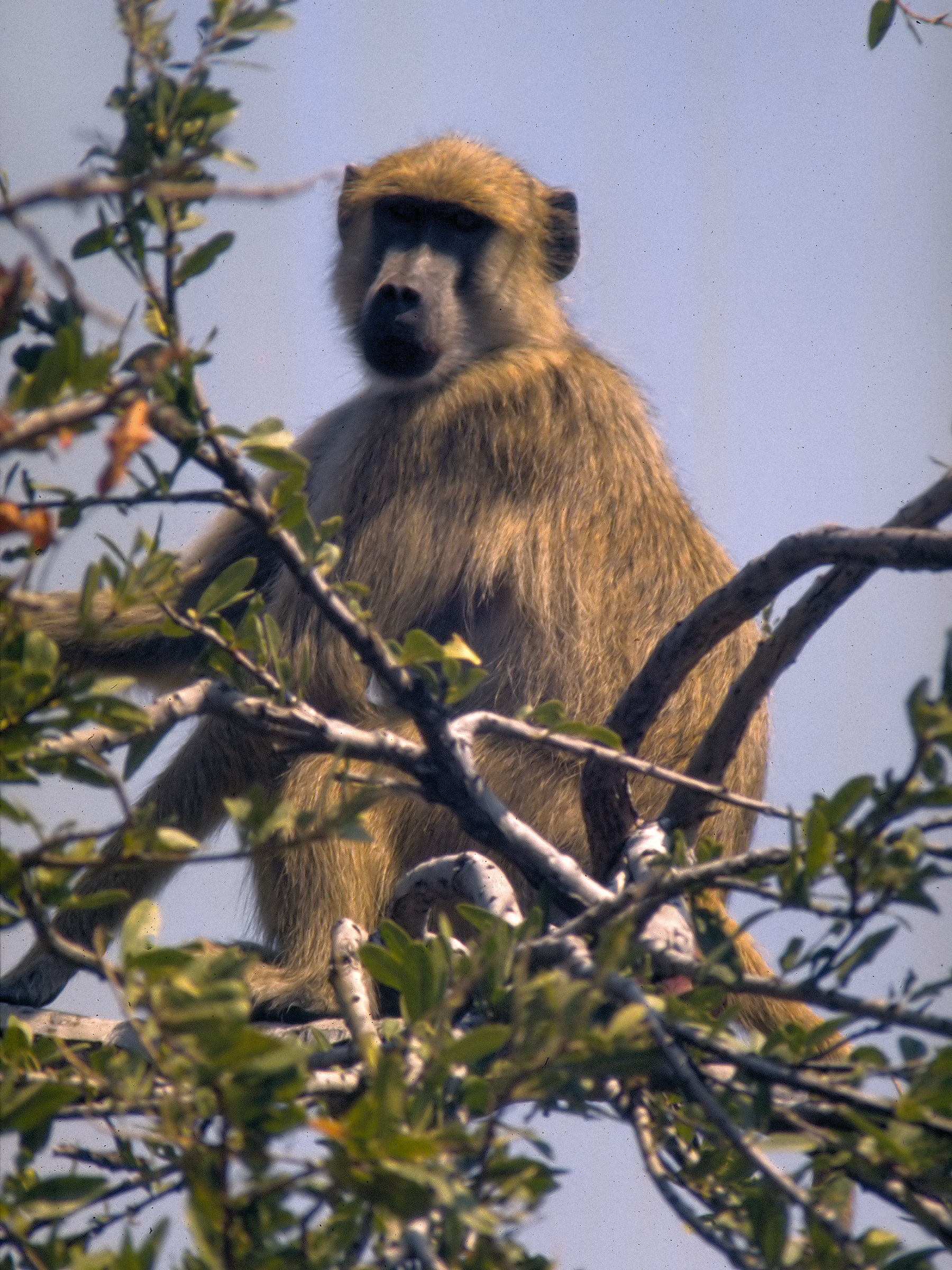
Chacma baboon

The order Primates contains humans and their closest relatives: lemurs, lorisoids, tarsiers, monkeys, and apes.

- Suborder: Haplorhini
  - Infraorder: Simiiformes
    - Parvorder: Catarrhini
      - Superfamily: Cercopithecoidea
        - Family: Cercopithecidae (Old World monkeys)
          - Genus: Papio
            - Chacma baboon, P. ursinus LC

== Order: Rodentia (rodents) ==
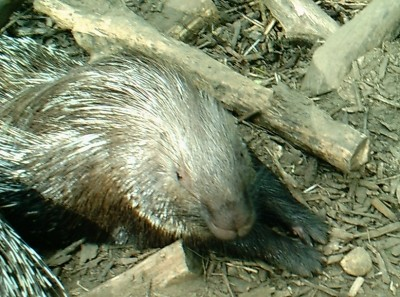
Cape porcupine

Rodents make up the largest order of mammals, with over 40% of mammalian species. They have two incisors in the upper and lower jaw which grow continually and must be kept short by gnawing. Most rodents are small though the capybara can weigh up to 45 kg (99 lb).

- Suborder: Hystricognathi
  - Family: Bathyergidae
    - Genus: Cryptomys
      - Common mole-rat, Cryptomys hottentotus LC
  - Family: Hystricidae (Old World porcupines)
    - Genus: Hystrix
      - Cape porcupine, Hystrix africaeaustralis LC
- Suborder: Sciurognathi
  - Family: Sciuridae (squirrels)
    - Subfamily: Xerinae
      - Tribe: Xerini
        - Genus: Xerus
          - South African ground squirrel, Xerus inauris LC
  - Family: Gliridae (dormice)
    - Subfamily: Graphiurinae
      - Genus: Graphiurus
        - Small-eared dormouse, Graphiurus microtis LC
  - Family: Nesomyidae
    - Subfamily: Dendromurinae
      - Genus: Dendromus
        - Chestnut climbing mouse, Dendromus mystacalis LC
      - Genus: Steatomys
        - Kreb's fat mouse, Steatomys krebsii LC
    - Subfamily: Mystromyinae
      - Genus: Mystromys
        - White-tailed rat, Mystromys albicaudatus EN
  - Family: Muridae (mice, rats, voles, gerbils, hamsters, etc.)
    - Subfamily: Otomyinae
      - Genus: Otomys
        - Vlei rat, Otomys irroratus LC
        - Sloggett's vlei rat, Otomys sloggetti LC
    - Subfamily: Gerbillinae
      - Genus: Tatera
        - Highveld gerbil, Tatera brantsii LC
    - Subfamily: Murinae
      - Genus: Aethomys
        - Namaqua rock rat, Aethomys namaquensis LC
      - Genus: Mastomys
        - Southern multimammate mouse, Mastomys coucha LC
        - Natal multimammate mouse, Mastomys natalensis LC
      - Genus: Mus
        - Orange mouse, Mus orangiae LC
      - Genus: Rhabdomys
        - Four-striped grass mouse, Rhabdomys pumilio LC

== Order: Lagomorpha (lagomorphs) ==
The lagomorphs comprise two families, Leporidae (hares and rabbits), and Ochotonidae (pikas). Though they can resemble rodents, and were classified as a superfamily in that order until the early 20th century, they have since been considered a separate order. They differ from rodents in a number of physical characteristics, such as having four incisors in the upper jaw rather than two.

- Family: Leporidae (rabbits, hares)
  - Genus: Lepus
    - Cape hare, Lepus capensis LR/lc
    - African savanna hare, Lepus microtis LR/lc

== Order: Erinaceomorpha (hedgehogs and gymnures) ==
The order Erinaceomorpha contains a single family, Erinaceidae, which comprise the hedgehogs and gymnures. The hedgehogs are easily recognised by their spines while gymnures look more like large rats.

- Family: Erinaceidae (hedgehogs)
  - Subfamily: Erinaceinae
    - Genus: Atelerix
      - Southern African hedgehog, Atelerix frontalis LR/lc

== Order: Soricomorpha (shrews, moles, and solenodons) ==
The "shrew-forms" are insectivorous mammals. The shrews and solenodons closely resemble mice while the moles are stout-bodied burrowers.

- Family: Soricidae (shrews)
  - Subfamily: Crocidurinae
    - Genus: Crocidura
      - Reddish-gray musk shrew, Crocidura cyanea LC
      - Greater red musk shrew, Crocidura flavescens LC
      - Tiny musk shrew, Crocidura fuscomurina LC
    - Genus: Suncus
      - Lesser dwarf shrew, Suncus varilla LC
  - Subfamily: Myosoricinae
    - Genus: Myosorex
      - Forest shrew, Myosorex varius LC

== Order: Chiroptera (bats) ==
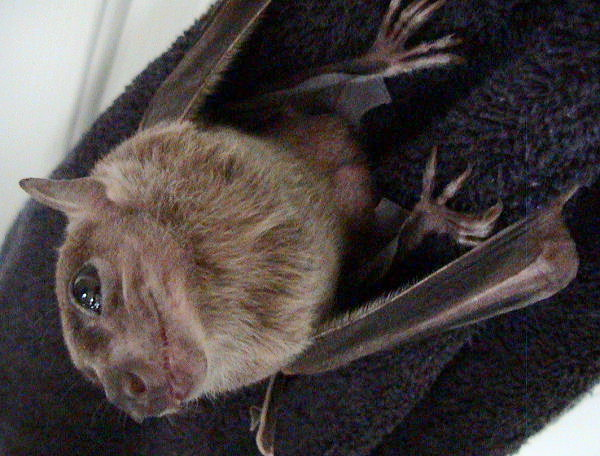
Egyptian fruit bat

The bats' most distinguishing feature is that their forelimbs are developed as wings, making them the only mammals capable of flight. Bat species account for about 20% of all mammals.

- Family: Pteropodidae (flying foxes, Old World fruit bats)
  - Subfamily: Pteropodinae
    - Genus: Eidolon
      - Straw-coloured fruit bat, Eidolon helvum LC
    - Genus: Rousettus
      - Egyptian fruit bat, Rousettus aegyptiacus LC
- Family: Vespertilionidae
  - Subfamily: Myotinae
    - Genus: Cistugo
      - Lesueur's hairy bat, Cistugo lesueuri VU
  - Subfamily: Vespertilioninae
    - Genus: Eptesicus
      - Long-tailed house bat, Eptesicus hottentotus LC
    - Genus: Laephotis
      - De Winton's long-eared bat, Laephotis wintoni LC
    - Genus: Neoromicia
      - Cape serotine, Neoromicia capensis LC
    - Genus: Scotophilus
      - African yellow bat, Scotophilus dinganii LC
  - Subfamily: Miniopterinae
    - Genus: Miniopterus
      - Natal long-fingered bat, Miniopterus natalensis NT
- Family: Nycteridae
  - Genus: Nycteris
    - Egyptian slit-faced bat, Nycteris thebaica LC
- Family: Rhinolophidae
  - Subfamily: Rhinolophinae
    - Genus: Rhinolophus
      - Geoffroy's horseshoe bat, Rhinolophus clivosus LC
      - Darling's horseshoe bat, Rhinolophus darlingi LC

== Order: Carnivora (carnivorans) ==
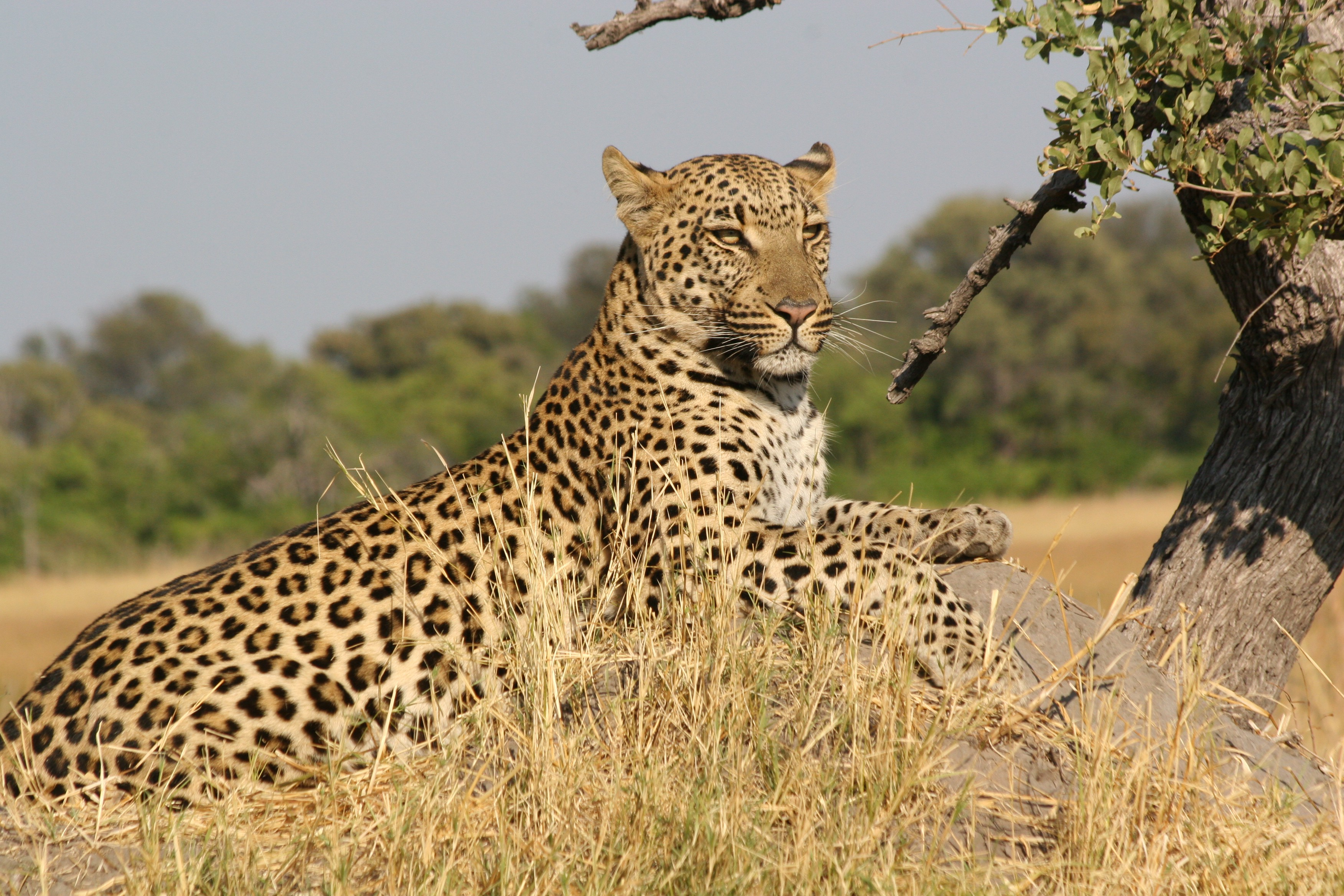
African leopard

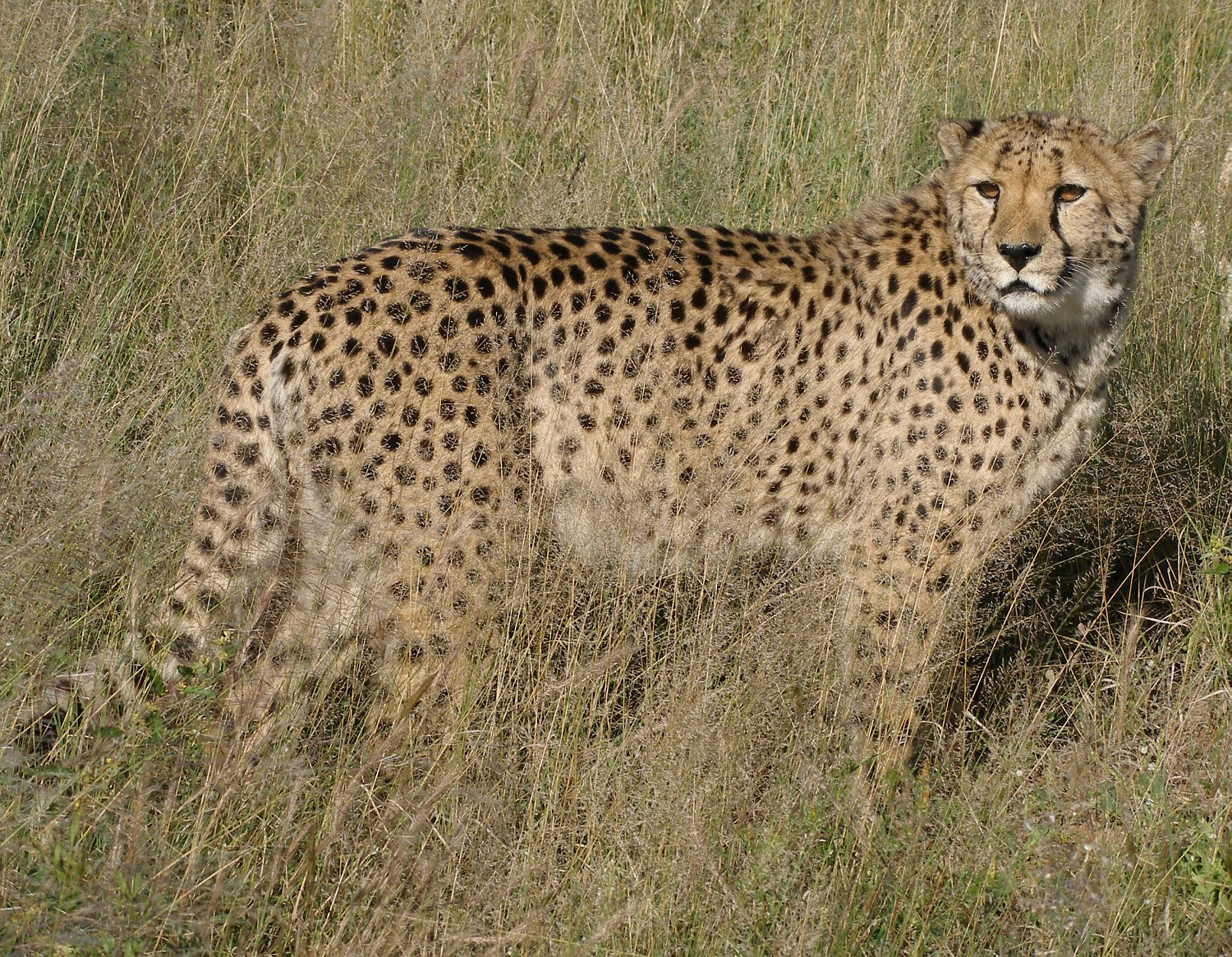
South African cheetah

There are over 260 species of carnivorans, the majority of which feed primarily on meat. They have a characteristic skull shape and dentition.

- Suborder: Feliformia
  - Family: Felidae (cats)
    - Subfamily: Felinae
      - Genus: Acinonyx
        - Cheetah, Acinonyx jubatus VU
          - South African cheetah, A. j. jubatus
      - Genus: Caracal
        - Caracal, Caracal caracal LC
      - Genus: Felis
        - African wildcat, F. lybica LC
      - Genus: Leptailurus
        - Serval, Leptailurus serval LC
    - Subfamily: Pantherinae
      - Genus: Panthera
        - Leopard, P. pardus VU possibly extirpated
          - African leopard, P. p. pardus
  - Family: Viverridae (civets)
    - Subfamily: Viverrinae
      - Genus: Genetta
        - Cape genet, Genetta tigrina LR/lc
  - Family: Herpestidae (mongooses)
    - Subfamily: Herpestinae
      - Genus: Herpestes
        - Cape gray mongoose, Herpestes pulverulentus LC
  - Family: Hyaenidae (hyaenas)
    - Genus: Parahyaena
      - Brown hyena, Parahyaena brunnea LR/nt
    - Genus: Proteles
      - Aardwolf, Proteles cristatus LR/lc
- Suborder: Caniformia
  - Family: Canidae (dogs, foxes)
    - Genus: Lupulella
      - Black-backed jackal, L. mesomelas LC
  - Family: Mustelidae (mustelids)
    - Genus: Ictonyx
      - Striped polecat, Ictonyx striatus LR/lc
    - Genus: Hydrictis
      - Speckle-throated otter, H. maculicollis NT possibly extirpated
    - Genus: Aonyx
      - African clawless otter, Aonyx capensis NT

== Order: Perissodactyla (odd-toed ungulates) ==
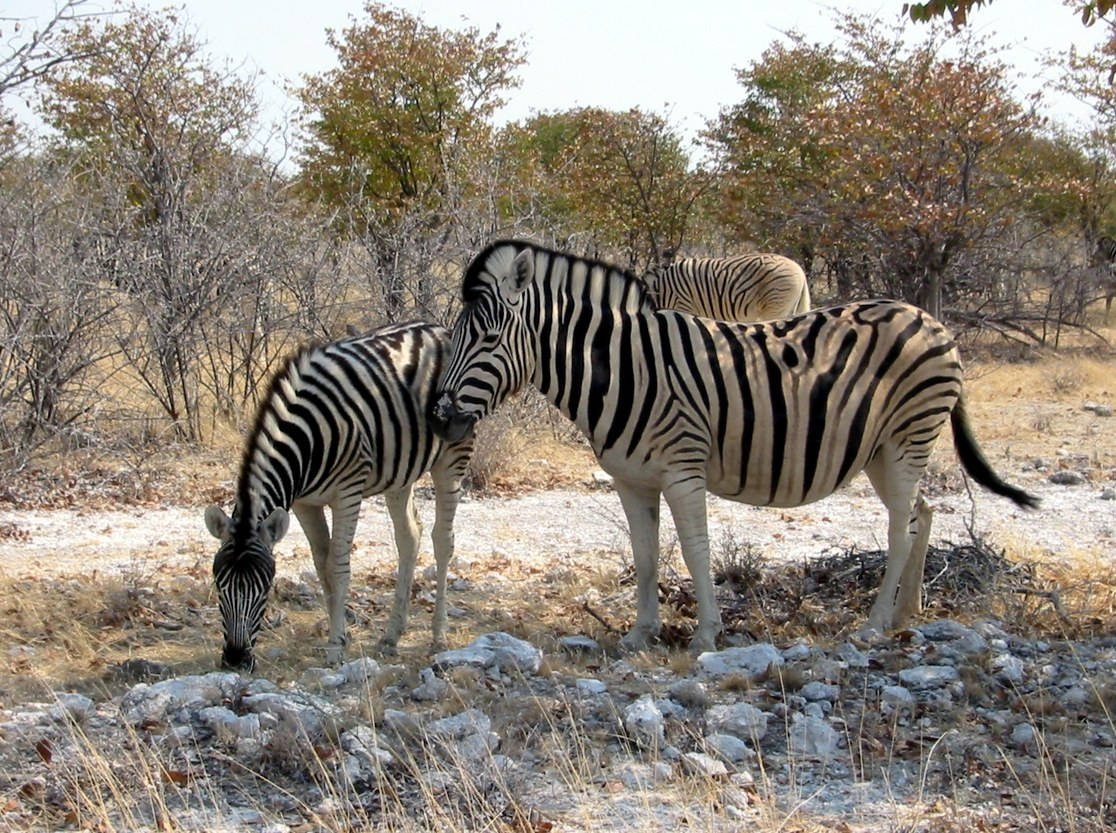
Burchell's zebra

The odd-toed ungulates are browsing and grazing mammals. They are usually large to very large, and have relatively simple stomachs and a large middle toe.

- Family: Equidae (horses etc.)
  - Genus: Equus
    - Plains zebra, E. quagga NT extirpated
      - Burchell's zebra, E. q. burchellii extirpated

== Order: Artiodactyla (even-toed ungulates) ==
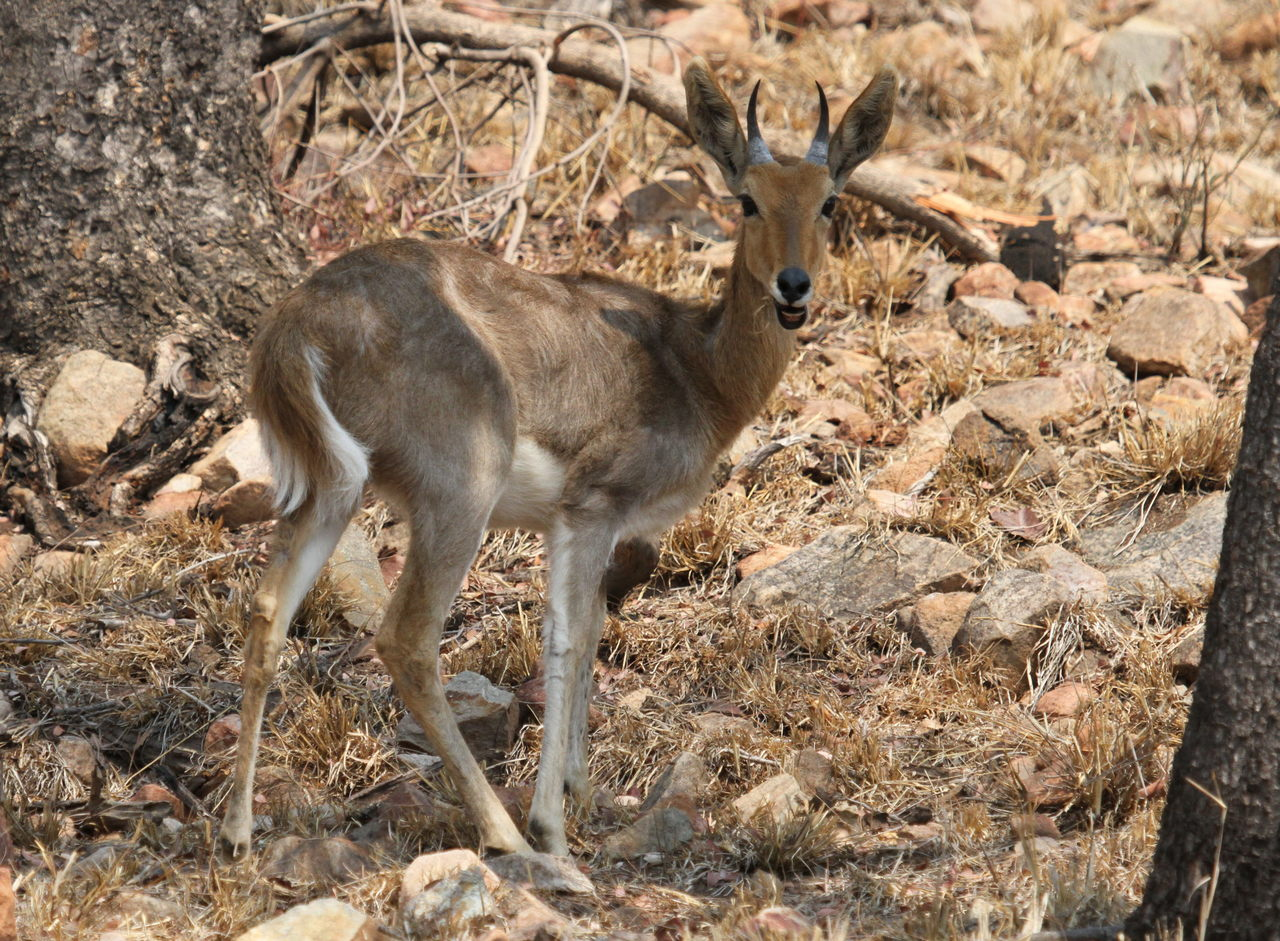
Mountain reedbuck

The even-toed ungulates are ungulates whose weight is borne about equally by the third and fourth toes, rather than mostly or entirely by the third as in perissodactyls. There are about 220 artiodactyl species, including many that are of great economic importance to humans.

- Family: Bovidae (cattle, antelope, sheep, goats)
  - Subfamily: Alcelaphinae
    - Genus: Alcelaphus
      - Hartebeest, Alcelaphus buselaphus LC extirpated
    - Genus: Connochaetes
      - Black wildebeest, Connochaetes gnou LC
    - Genus: Damaliscus
      - Bontebok, Damaliscus pygargus LR/cd
  - Subfamily: Antilopinae
    - Genus: Oreotragus
      - Klipspringer, Oreotragus oreotragus LR/cd
    - Genus: Ourebia
      - Oribi, Ourebia ourebi LR/cd
  - Subfamily: Bovinae
    - Genus: Syncerus
      - African buffalo, S. caffer NT extirpated
    - Genus: Tragelaphus
      - Common eland, Tragelaphus oryx LR/cd
      - Cape bushbuck, Tragelaphus scriptus LC possibly extirpated
  - Subfamily: Cephalophinae
    - Genus: Cephalophus
      - Blue duiker, Cephalophus monticola LR/lc
    - Genus: Sylvicapra
      - Common duiker, Sylvicapra grimmia LR/lc
  - Subfamily: Peleinae
    - Genus: Pelea
      - Grey rhebok, Pelea capreolus LC
  - Subfamily: Reduncinae
    - Genus: Redunca
      - Mountain reedbuck, Redunca fulvorufula LC

== See also ==
- List of chordate orders
- Lists of mammals by region
- List of prehistoric mammals
- Mammal classification
- List of mammals described in the 2000s
