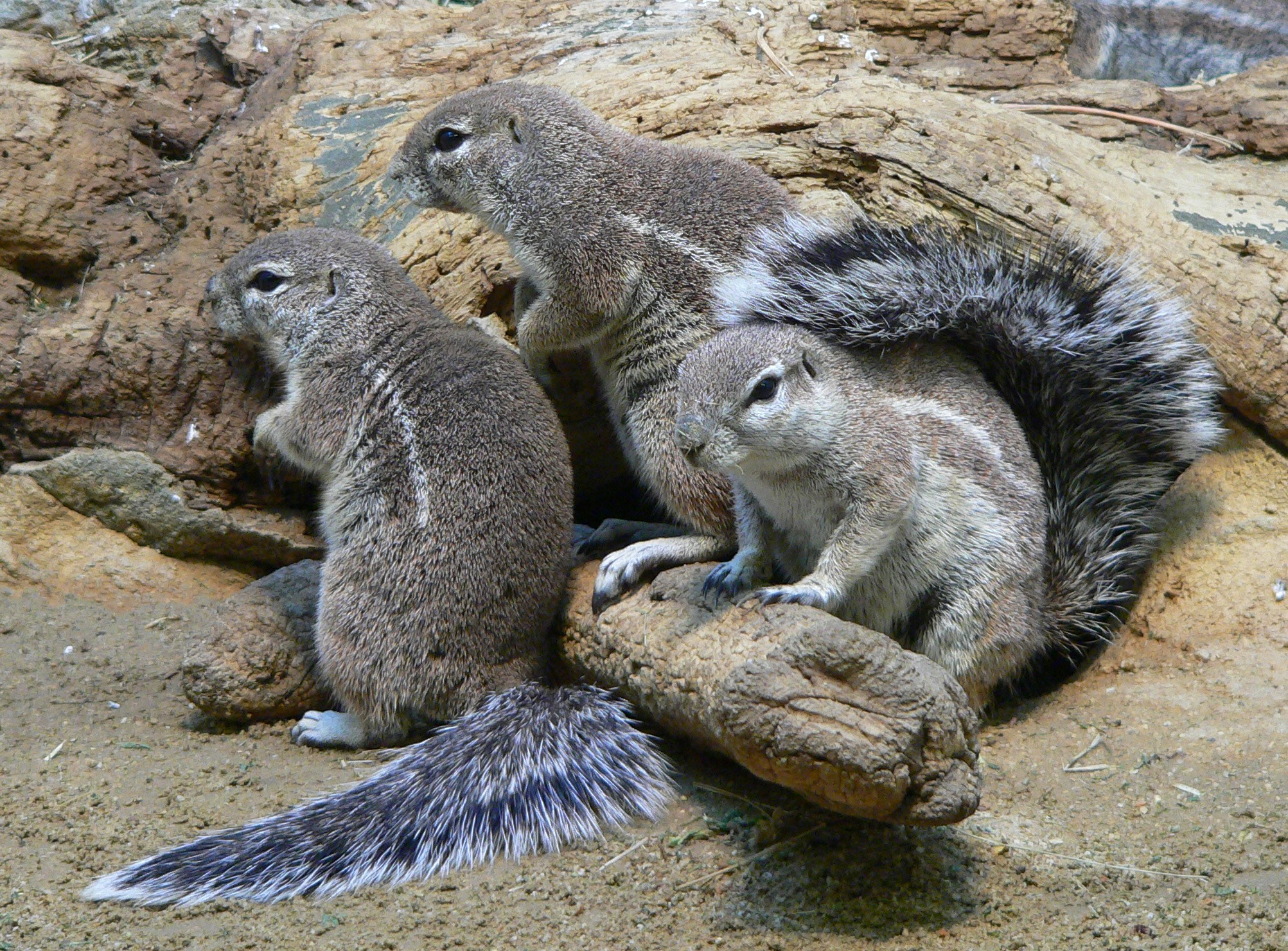
- South African ground squirrel (Xerus inauris)

Scientific classification
- Kingdom: Animalia
- Phylum: Chordata
- Class: Mammalia
- Order: Rodentia
- Family: Sciuridae
- Subfamily: Xerinae; Osborn, 1910

Tribes
- Xerini; Protoxerini; Marmotini

= Xerinae =

Subfamily of mammals

The Xerinae are the most species-rich subfamily of squirrels, many of which are highly terrestrial. They include the tribes Marmotini (marmots, chipmunks, prairie dogs, and other Holarctic ground squirrels), Xerini (African and some Eurasian ground squirrels), and Protoxerini (African tree squirrels).

The Xerinae first originated in Eurasia but later dispersed to other parts of the world. One of which was Africa, where they traveled via land bridges in the Miocene period, leading to the emergence of Protoxerini and Xerini ground squirrel tribes. Many Xerinae also dispersed to North America during the early Oligocene era, and with the help of global cooling and the expansion of grasslands, resulted in the emergence of the Marmotini ground squirrel tribe.

== Taxonomy ==
Tribe Xerini six species of ground squirrels in five genera, occurring in Africa and Asia.

- Atlantoxerus
- Euxerus
- Geosciurus
- Spermophilopsis
- Xerus

Tribe Protoxerini thirty species of tree squirrels in six genera, occurring in Africa.

- Epixerus
- Funisciurus
- Heliosciurus
- Myosciurus
- Paraxerus
- Protoxerus

Tribe Marmotini ground squirrels in fifteen genera, occurring world wide. Includes the prairie dogs, the marmots (including woodchuck), and chipmunks.

- Ammospermophilus
- Callospermophilus
- Cynomys
- Eutamias
- Ictidomys
- Marmota
- Neotamias
- Notocitellus
- Otospermophilus
- Poliocitellus
- Sciurotamias
- Spermophilus
- Tamias
- Urocitellus
- Xerospermophilus
