= Mesothrips =

Scientific classification
- Kingdom: Animalia
- Phylum: Arthropoda
- Class: Insecta
- Order: Thysanoptera
- Family: Phlaeothripidae
- Genus: Mesothrips; Zimmermann, 1900

Genus of thrips

Mesothrips is a genus of thrips in the family Phlaeothripidae.

== Species ==
- Mesothrips acutus
- Mesothrips alluaudi
- Mesothrips ambasensis
- Mesothrips angusticollis
- Mesothrips annamensis
- Mesothrips apatelus
- Mesothrips armatus
- Mesothrips bhimabahu
- Mesothrips breviceps
- Mesothrips citritibiae
- Mesothrips claripennis
- Mesothrips constrictus
- Mesothrips cracens
- Mesothrips elaeocarpi
- Mesothrips extensivus
- Mesothrips fulmeki
- Mesothrips guamensis
- Mesothrips ignotus
- Mesothrips jasmini
- Mesothrips jordani
- Mesothrips latifolii
- Mesothrips latus
- Mesothrips leeuweni
- Mesothrips lividicornis
- Mesothrips longisetis
- Mesothrips malloti
- Mesothrips manii
- Mesothrips melinocnemis
- Mesothrips memecylonicus
- Mesothrips mendax
- Mesothrips moundi
- Mesothrips orientalis
- Mesothrips parvus
- Mesothrips perlucidus
- Mesothrips picticornis
- Mesothrips pyctes
- Mesothrips schouteniae
- Mesothrips sus
- Mesothrips swezeyi
- Mesothrips ustulatus
- Mesothrips vitis
- Mesothrips vitripennis
