= Gigantothrips =

Scientific classification
- Kingdom: Animalia
- Phylum: Arthropoda
- Class: Insecta
- Order: Thysanoptera
- Family: Phlaeothripidae
- Genus: Gigantothrips; Zimmermann, 1900

Genus of thrips

Gigantothrips is a genus of thrips in the family Phlaeothripidae.

== Species ==
- Gigantothrips afer
- Gigantothrips baculifer
- Gigantothrips brevicornis
- Gigantothrips caudatus
- Gigantothrips elegans
- Gigantothrips gallicola
- Gigantothrips gardneri
- Gigantothrips halidayi
- Gigantothrips marshalli
- Gigantothrips micrurus
- Gigantothrips modestus
- Gigantothrips nigripes
- Gigantothrips nigrodentatus
- Gigantothrips ochroscelis
- Gigantothrips pontis
- Gigantothrips priesneri
- Gigantothrips rossi
- Gigantothrips schenklingi
- Gigantothrips seshadrii
- Gigantothrips tibialis
- Gigantothrips vuilleti
- Gigantothrips xynos
