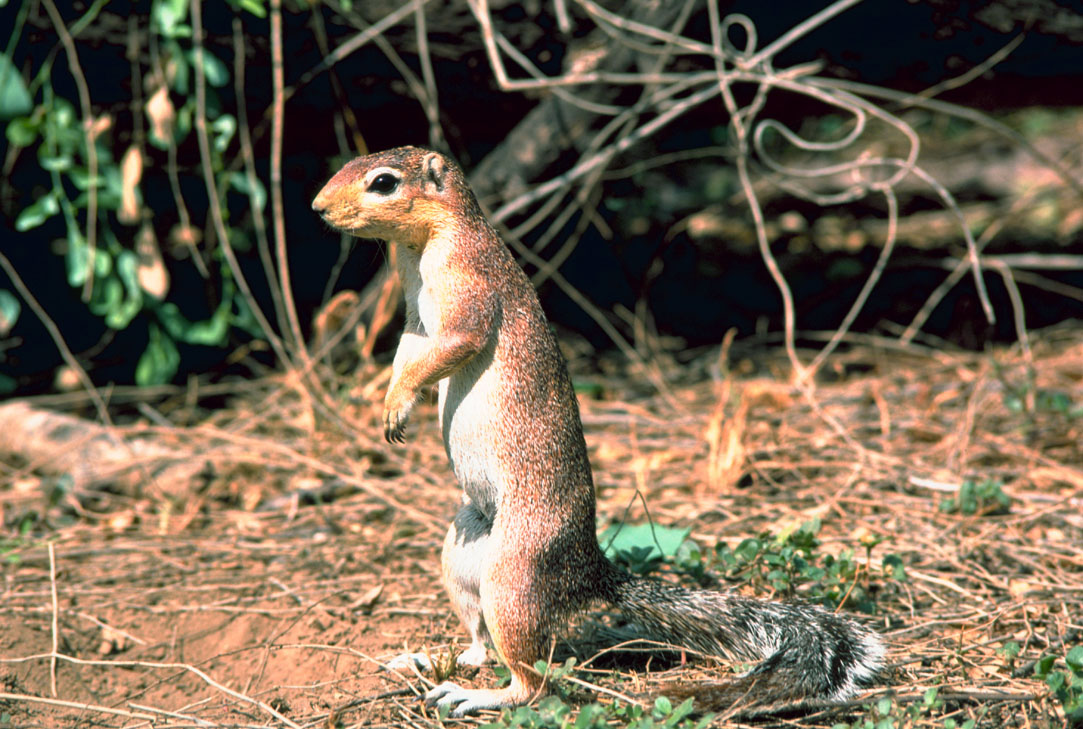
- Unstriped ground squirrel (Xerus rutilus)

Scientific classification
- Kingdom: Animalia
- Phylum: Chordata
- Class: Mammalia
- Order: Rodentia
- Family: Sciuridae
- Subfamily: Xerinae
- Tribe: Xerini; Osborn, 1910

Genera
- Atlantoxerus; Euxerus; Geosciurus; Xerus; Spermophilopsis

= Xerini =

Xerini Temporal range: Early Oligocene - Recent

Tribe of rodents

Xerini is a tribe of ground squirrels occurring in Africa and Asia. With the tribes Marmotini (Holarctic ground squirrels) and Protoxerini (African tree squirrels), they form the subfamily Xerinae. There are five living genera—Xerus, the unstriped ground squirrel; Euxerus, the striped ground squirrel; Geosciurus, the Cape and mountain ground squirrels; Atlantoxerus, containing the living Barbary ground squirrel of North Africa and some extinct species; and Spermophilopsis, containing the long-clawed ground squirrel of Central Asia.

The squirrels live in open woodlands, grasslands, or rocky country. They are diurnal and terrestrial, living in burrows. Their diet is roots, seeds, fruits, pods, grains, insects, small vertebrates and bird eggs. They live in colonies similar to North American prairie dogs, and have similar behavior. If kept as pets, they run free as house cats do, otherwise farmers consider them pests. Breeding in South African ground squirrels is asynchronous and there is no specific period of breeding although very few litters are seen above the ground in the months of July to October. Gestation period lasts for 48 days and the young ones are weaned after 52 days. There are one to three babies per litter. A female becomes sexually mature when she is 10 months old and a male matures at the age of 8 months. Although a female has the capability to breed throughout the year, less than 10% reproduce more than one litter in a year.

The South African ground squirrel does not hibernate. These squirrels are very social and live in groups with about 1 to 3 females and 2 to 3 males. Sometimes, the number of males can exceed up to 9 with some sub-adult females. An interesting thing about this breed is that mature males like to form their own groups and there can be 19 to 20 individuals in one group. These groups are called bands.

Their home range is shared with other groups. In many other mammals, males compete strongly for access to females. In these squirrels, living in groups appears to give protection from predators that outweighs the cost of competition for breeding opportunities.

== Species ==
Extant species

- Genus Atlantoxerus
  - Barbary ground squirrel, Atlantoxerus getulus
- Genus Euxerus
  - Striped ground squirrel, Euxerus erythropus
- Genus Geosciurus
  - Cape ground squirrel, Geosciurus inauris
  - Mountain ground squirrel, Geosciurus princeps
- Genus Xerus
  - Unstriped ground squirrel, Xerus rutilus
- Genus Spermophilopsis
  - Long-clawed ground squirrel, Spermophilopsis leptodactylus

Fossil species

- Genus Heteroxerus
  - †Heteroxerus grivensis
- Genus Aragoxerus
  - †Aragoxerus ignis
