= Angolan hairy bat =

Conservation status
- Least Concern (IUCN 3.1)

Scientific classification
- Kingdom: Animalia
- Phylum: Chordata
- Class: Mammalia
- Order: Chiroptera
- Family: Cistugidae
- Genus: Cistugo
- Species: C. seabrae

Binomial name
- Cistugo seabrae Thomas, 1912
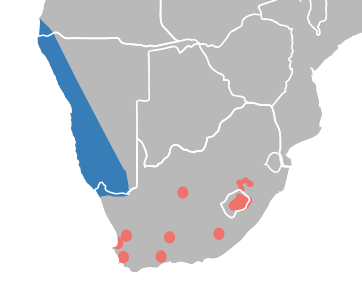
- Cistugo distribution C. seabrae in blue

Synonyms
- Myotis seabrai Thomas, 1912; Cistugo seabrai (misspelling)

Species of bat

The Angolan hairy bat (Cistugo seabrae) also known as Angolan wing-gland bat is a species of bat in the Cistugidae family. It can be found in hot deserts in Angola, Namibia, and South Africa.

== Taxonomy and etymology ==
It was described as a new species in 1912 by British zoologist Oldfield Thomas. Thomas decided that the taxa was so distinct, it warranted the description of a new genus, Cistugo. The Angolan hairy bat is the type species for Cistugo. The holotype of the species was captured in Mossamedes, Angola. The eponym for the species name "seabrae" is Antero Frederico de Seabra.

== Description ==
It has "peculiar thickened glands" on its wings with three on each wing. The glands are 3–3.5 mm (0.12–0.14 in) in length and 1–1.5 mm (0.039–0.059 in) in width. Its forearm is approximately 32.5 mm (1.28 in) long.

== Range and status ==
It is found in several countries in Southern Africa including Angola, Namibia, and South Africa. It is typically documented in arid areas with less than 100 mm (3.9 in) of annual rainfall. As of 2017, it is evaluated as a least-concern species by the IUCN.
