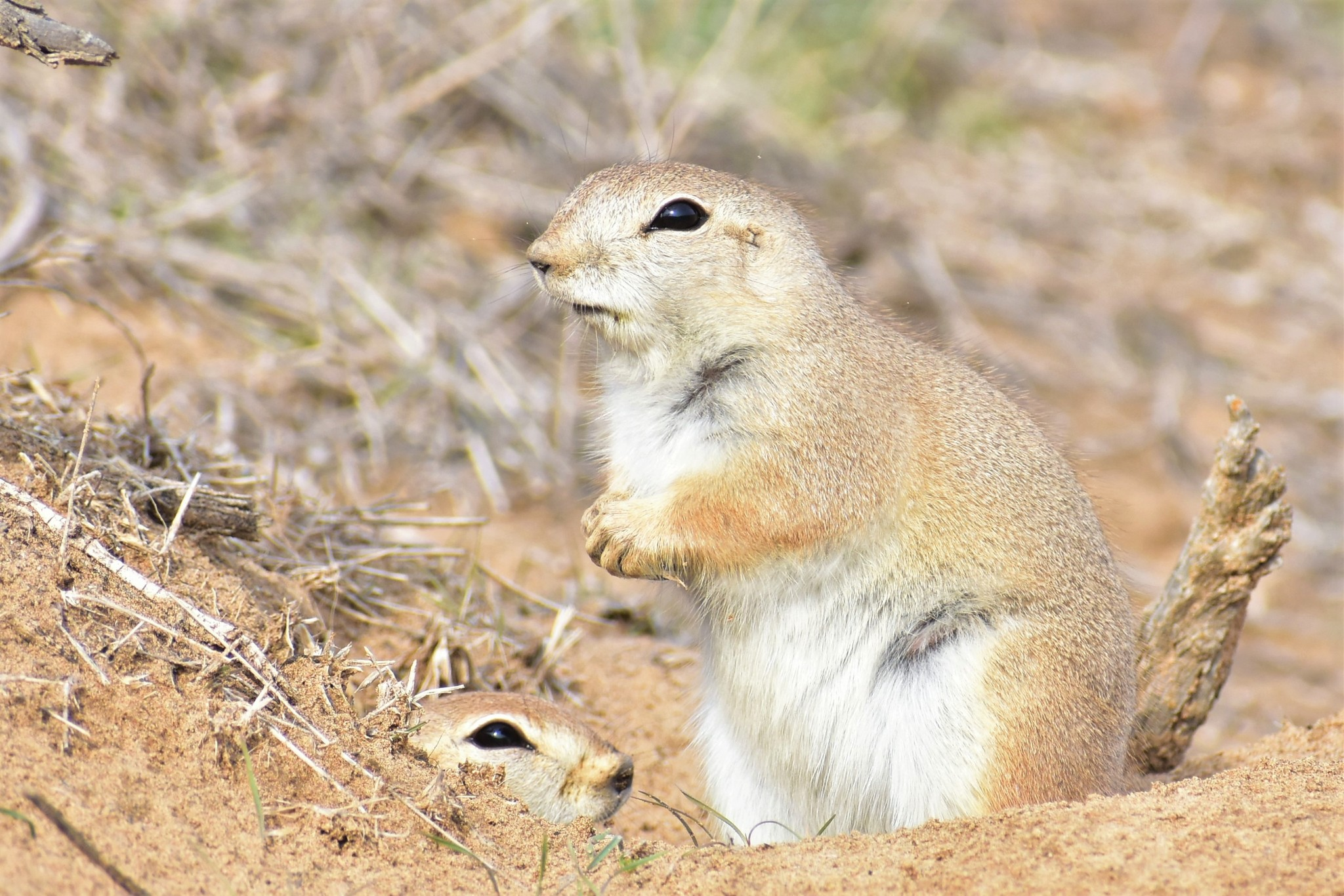

Conservation status
- Least Concern (IUCN 3.1)

Scientific classification
- Kingdom: Animalia
- Phylum: Chordata
- Class: Mammalia
- Order: Rodentia
- Family: Sciuridae
- Subfamily: Xerinae
- Tribe: Xerini
- Genus: Spermophilopsis; Blasius, 1884
- Species: S. leptodactylus

Binomial name
- Spermophilopsis leptodactylus (Lichtenstein, 1823)

= Long-clawed ground squirrel =

Species of rodent

The long-clawed ground squirrel (Spermophilopsis leptodactylus) is a squirrel species native to grasslands and deserts in northeastern Iran, Tajikistan, Turkmenistan, northwestern Afghanistan, Uzbekistan and Kazakhstan. It is the only member of the tribe Xerini not native to Africa.
