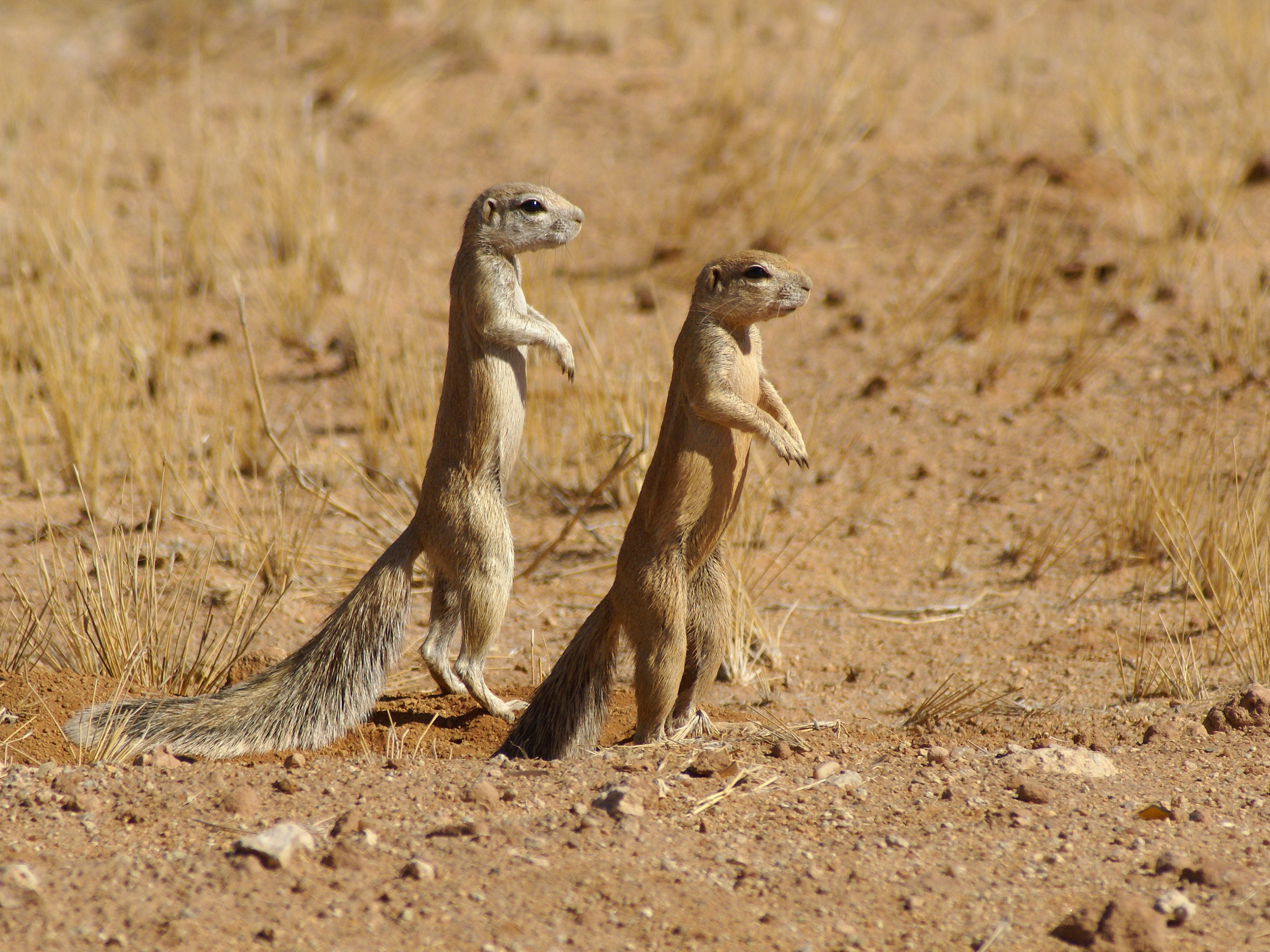
- Cape ground squirrel (Geosciurus inauris)

Scientific classification
- Kingdom: Animalia
- Phylum: Chordata
- Class: Mammalia
- Order: Rodentia
- Family: Sciuridae
- Tribe: Xerini
- Genus: Geosciurus; A. Smith, 1834

Type species
- Sciurus capensis Kerr, 1792 (= Sciurus inauris Zimmermann, 1780)

Species
- 2 sp., see text

= Geosciurus =

Genus of rodents

The genus Geosciurus of African ground squirrels are found in most of the drier parts of southern Africa from South Africa, through to Botswana, and into Namibia.

== Species ==
Image	Scientific name	Common name	Distribution
	Geosciurus inauris (Zimmermann, 1780)	Cape ground squirrel	southern Africa from South Africa, through to Botswana, and into Namibia, including Etosha National Park.
	Geosciurus princeps Thomas, 1929	Mountain ground squirrel	southern Angola to southern Namibia and as far south as Richtersveld National Park.
