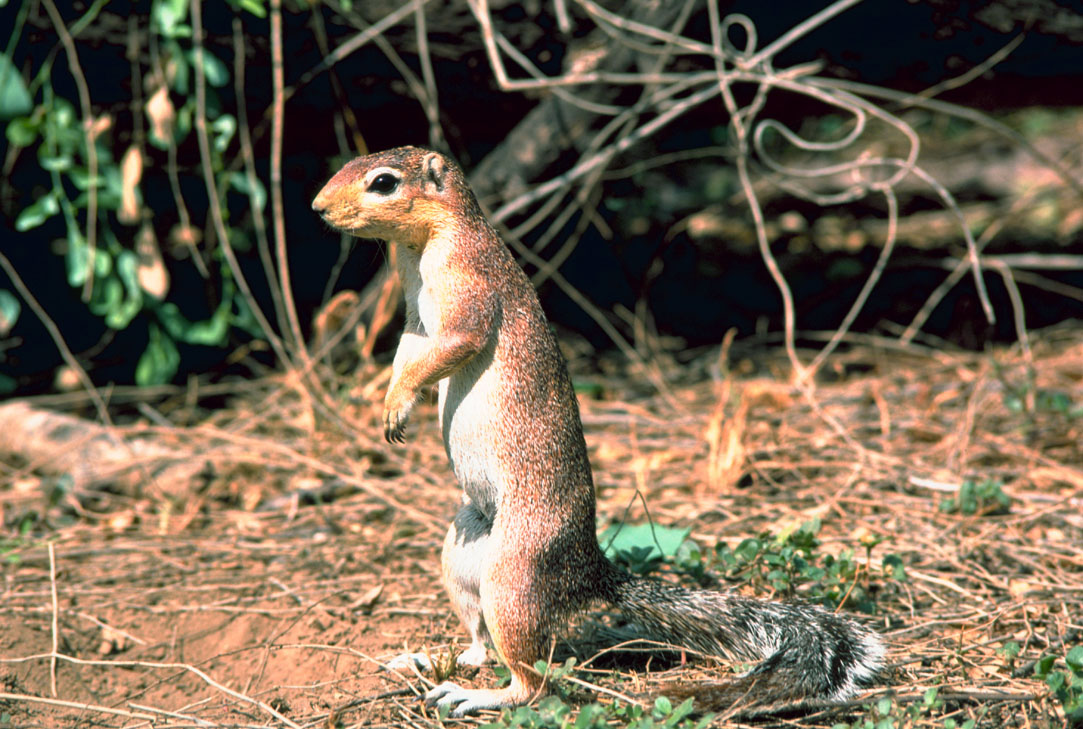

Conservation status
- Least Concern (IUCN 3.1)

Scientific classification
- Kingdom: Animalia
- Phylum: Chordata
- Class: Mammalia
- Order: Rodentia
- Family: Sciuridae
- Tribe: Xerini
- Genus: Xerus; Hemprich & Ehrenberg, 1833
- Species: X. rutilus

Binomial name
- Xerus rutilus (Cretzschmar, 1828)

= Unstriped ground squirrel =

Species of rodent

The unstriped ground squirrel (Xerus rutilus) is a species of rodent (order Rodentia) in the family Sciuridae. It is the only member of the genus Xerus. It is found in Djibouti, Eritrea, Ethiopia, Kenya, Somalia, Sudan, Tanzania, and Uganda. Its natural habitats are dry savanna and subtropical or tropical dry shrubland.

== Description ==
The unstriped ground squirrel is brownish or tawny in color with a lighter colored front. As the name suggests the X. rutilus differs from other species of African ground squirrel by not having dorsal-running longitudinal white stripes. The eye is ringed with white hair (all hair being coarse in observed specimens). Their small head and body measure on average 225.8 millimetres (8.89 in) long with an average tail length of 172 mm (6.8 in). This tail is flat in appearance. Body weight varies across studies and habitats and ranges from 257.7 to 420 grams (9.09 to 14.82 oz). The length of the hind foot is 35–49 mm with a braincase measuring only 24–25 mm. The length of the mandible is variable in the range of 31.0 to 33.9 mm.

Xerus rutilus is a member of the Xerini tribe, but differs from its sister group Xerus daamsi. Both are separate and distinct from the North African equivalent Atlantoxerus. Vibrissae (whiskers) length and brain size are both smaller than arboreal squirrels of the region, but are similar to other terrestrial squirrels.

No significant sexual dimorphism is noted in X. rutilus.

== Local and indigenous names ==
In Tigrinya language: ምጹጽላይ or ጨጨራ (mitsutsilay, chechera).

In Turkana: [ekuɲuk], borrowed further in Daasanach: [ɲékuɲug]

== Ecology ==
=== Range and habitat ===
The unstriped ground squirrel is endemic to Ethiopia, Kenya, Sudan, Tanzania, Djibouti, Eritrea and Uganda and probably extant in Somalia. Its natural habitats include dry (arid) savanna and subtropical or tropical dry shrubland. Populations occupy many overlapping regions with its sister group, the African striped ground squirrel (Euxerus erythropus), in northeastern Africa. X. rutilus dig and occupy burrows in generally arid conditions.

=== Diet and foraging ===
The unstriped ground squirrels demonstrate diurnality with an omnivorous diet consisting of leaves, tree fruits (Adansonia digital), seeds (Commiphora and Acacia trees), other plant materials, and insects. Studies show that X. rutilus is unaffected by poisonous tannins and to some degree eats oxalic-containing foods. X. rutilus has been shown to be uniquely efficient in its capacity to forage for food. This ability is not diminished across a variety of different environments, including those with a poor to moderate food supply.

== Behavior ==
=== Burrows ===
X. rutilus are mainly solitary. They live in burrow systems with one or two adults with overlapping home areas. In times of danger unstriped ground squirrel may dive into a foreign burrow for safety. Unstriped ground squirrels permit non-resident squirrels to enter their burrows, including those of other species (E. erythropus). They spend most of their waking hours outside their burrows, but utilize them for sleep and shelter from the elements. They move around quite often during the day, but remain sedentary.

=== Dominance hierarchy ===
Although not territorial, a dominance hierarchy exists with male squirrels being dominant over females and younger squirrels. X. rutilus demonstrate dominance via vocalization, tail displays, and physical lunges.

== Physiology ==
=== Thermoregulation ===
Unstriped ground squirrels generally reside in hot arid conditions and compensate by exhibiting behavioral thermoregulation. After periods of foraging in hot areas, they retreat to the shade and lie down on the shaded ground to cool off.

== Sources ==
- Thorington, R.W. Jr; Hoffman, R.S. (2005). "Family Sciuridae". In Wilson, D.E.; Reeder, D.M (eds.). Mammal Species of the World: A Taxonomic and Geographic Reference (3rd ed.). Johns Hopkins University Press. pp. 754–818. ISBN 978-0-8018-8221-0. OCLC 62265494.
