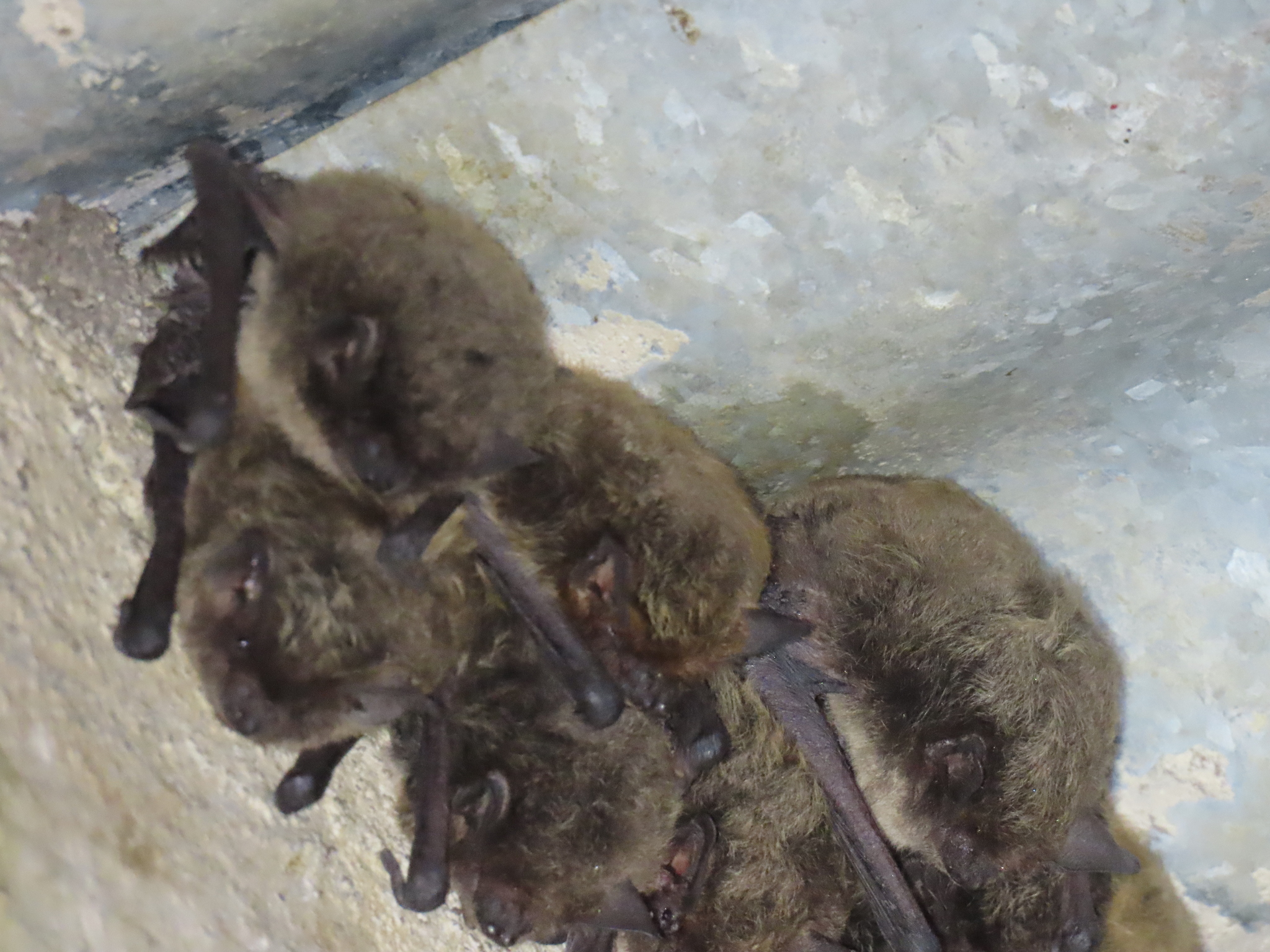

Conservation status
- Least Concern (IUCN 3.1)

Scientific classification
- Kingdom: Animalia
- Phylum: Chordata
- Class: Mammalia
- Order: Chiroptera
- Family: Cistugidae
- Genus: Cistugo
- Species: C. lesueuri

Binomial name
- Cistugo lesueuri Roberts, 1919
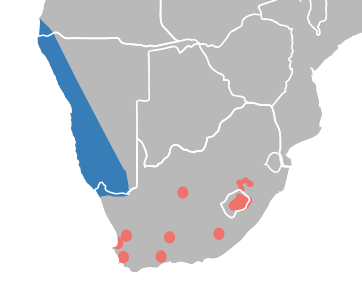
- Cistugo distribution C. lesueuri in red

Synonyms
- Myotis lesueuri (Roberts, 1919)

= Lesueur's hairy bat =

Species of bat

Lesueur's hairy bat (Cistugo lesueuri) also known as Lesueur's wing-gland bat is a species of bat in the family Cistugidae. It is found in dry savanna, Mediterranean-type shrubby vegetation, and hot deserts in Lesotho and South Africa.
