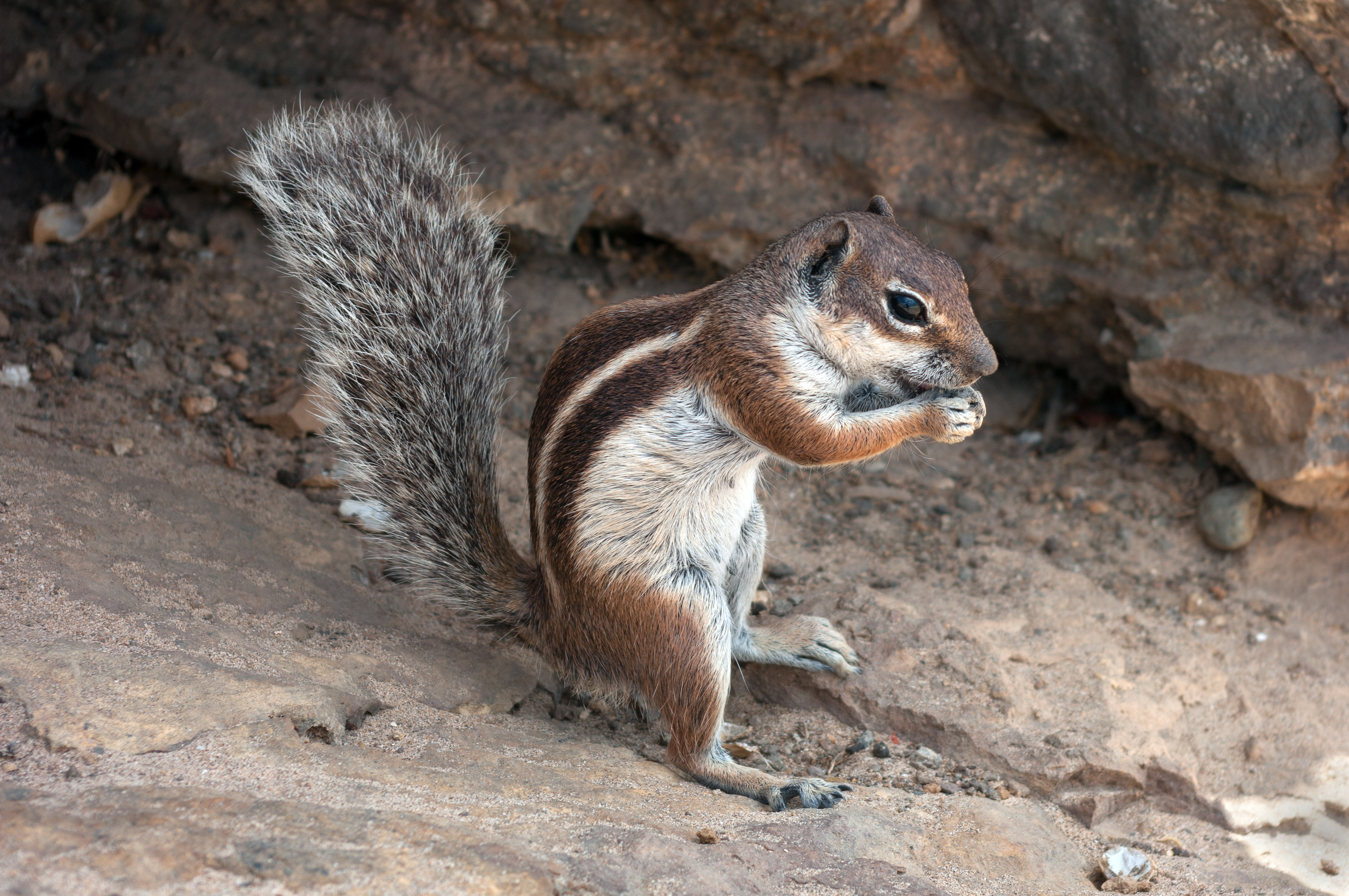

Conservation status
- Least Concern (IUCN 3.1)

Scientific classification
- Kingdom: Animalia
- Phylum: Chordata
- Class: Mammalia
- Order: Rodentia
- Family: Sciuridae
- Tribe: Xerini
- Genus: Atlantoxerus; Forsyth Major, 1893
- Species: A. getulus

Binomial name
- Atlantoxerus getulus (Linnaeus, 1758)
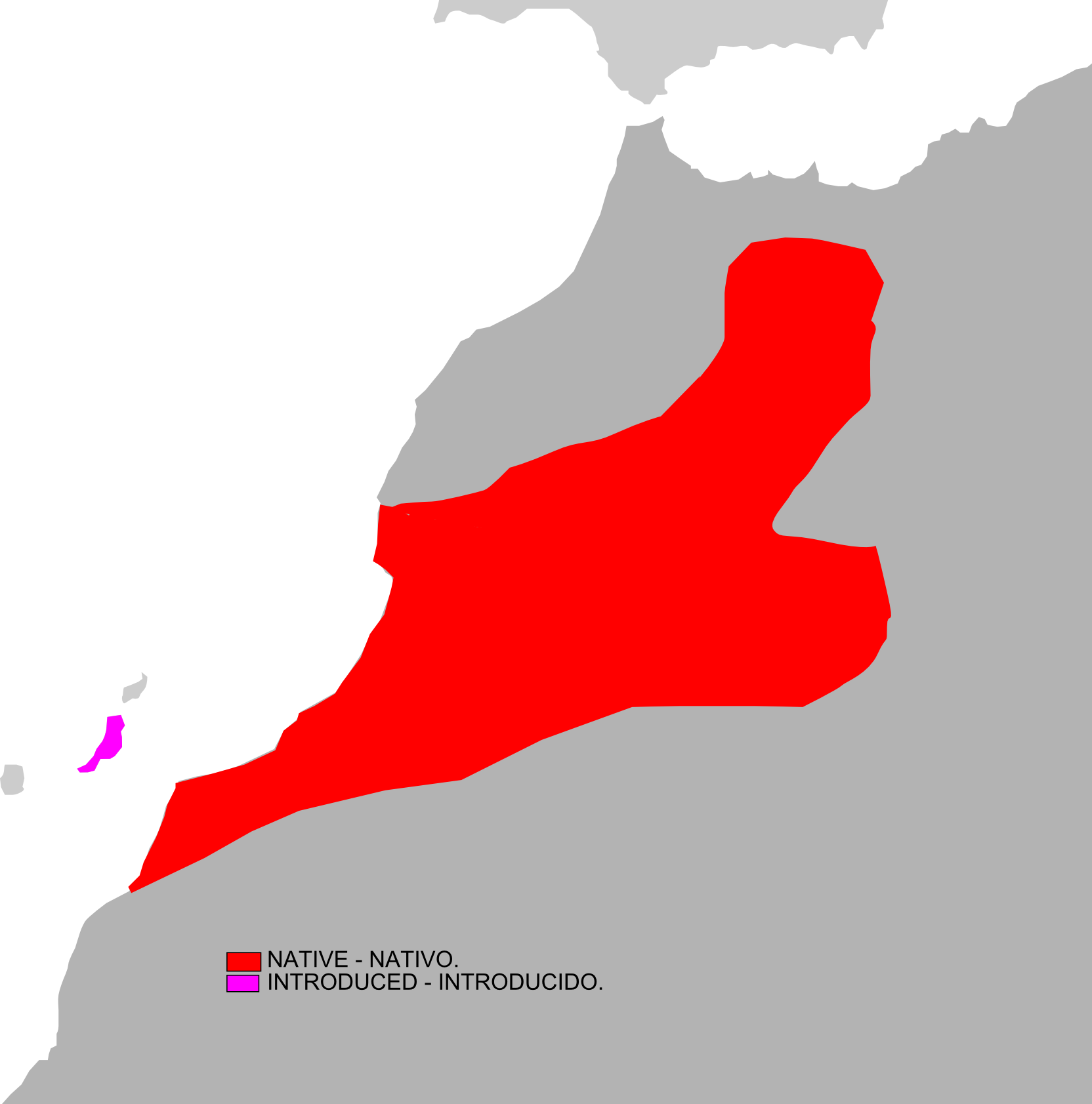

Synonyms
- Sciurus getulus Linnaeus, 1758

= Barbary ground squirrel =

Barbary ground squirrel Temporal range: Early Miocene - Recent

Species of rodent

The Barbary ground squirrel (Atlantoxerus getulus) is a species of rodent in the family Sciuridae. It is monotypic within the genus Atlantoxerus. It is endemic to the Atlas mountains in Morocco and some parts in Algeria, and has been introduced into the Canary Islands. Its natural habitats are subtropical or tropical dry shrubland, temperate grassland and rocky areas where it lives colonially in burrows. It was first described by Carl Linnaeus in his landmark 1758 10th edition of Systema Naturae.

== Description ==
The Barbary ground squirrel is a small species growing to a length of between 160 and 220 millimetres (6.3 and 8.7 in) with a bushy tail of a similar length. It weighs up to 350 grams (12 oz) and has short wiry hair. The general colour is greyish-brown or reddish-brown and there is a white stripe running along each side, and sometimes another along the spine. The belly is paler grey and the tail is longitudinally barred in black and grey.

== Distribution ==
The Barbary ground squirrel is found on the Barbary Coast of Western Sahara, Morocco and Algeria on the seaward side of the Atlas Mountains and was introduced into the island of Fuerteventura in the Canary Islands in 1965. It is one of only two species of squirrel to inhabit Africa north of the Sahara, the other being a small population of striped ground squirrel in southern Morocco. Its habitat is arid rocky ground and it is found in mountainous regions up to an altitude of about 4,000 metres (13,000 ft).

== Biology ==
The Barbary ground squirrel is a colonial animal and lives in family groups in burrows in dry grassland, bushy and rocky areas including disturbed agricultural land, or in dens among rocks. It needs access to water but is not found in irrigated fields. It tends to come out to feed early in the morning and again in the evening, retreating into its burrow during the heat of the day. It feeds on plant material and a major part of its diet is the fruit and seeds of the argan tree (Argania spinosa). If the population builds up and food is scarce, the Barbary ground squirrel may migrate. The females give birth to litters of up to four young, twice a year.

== Status ==
The population of the Barbary ground squirrel is believed to be stable and it is common over its range up to elevations of 2,000 metres (6,600 ft) but is more widely dispersed at higher altitudes. It is also less common at the eastern end of its range. It is listed in the IUCN Red List of Threatened Species as being of "least concern".

== Gallery ==
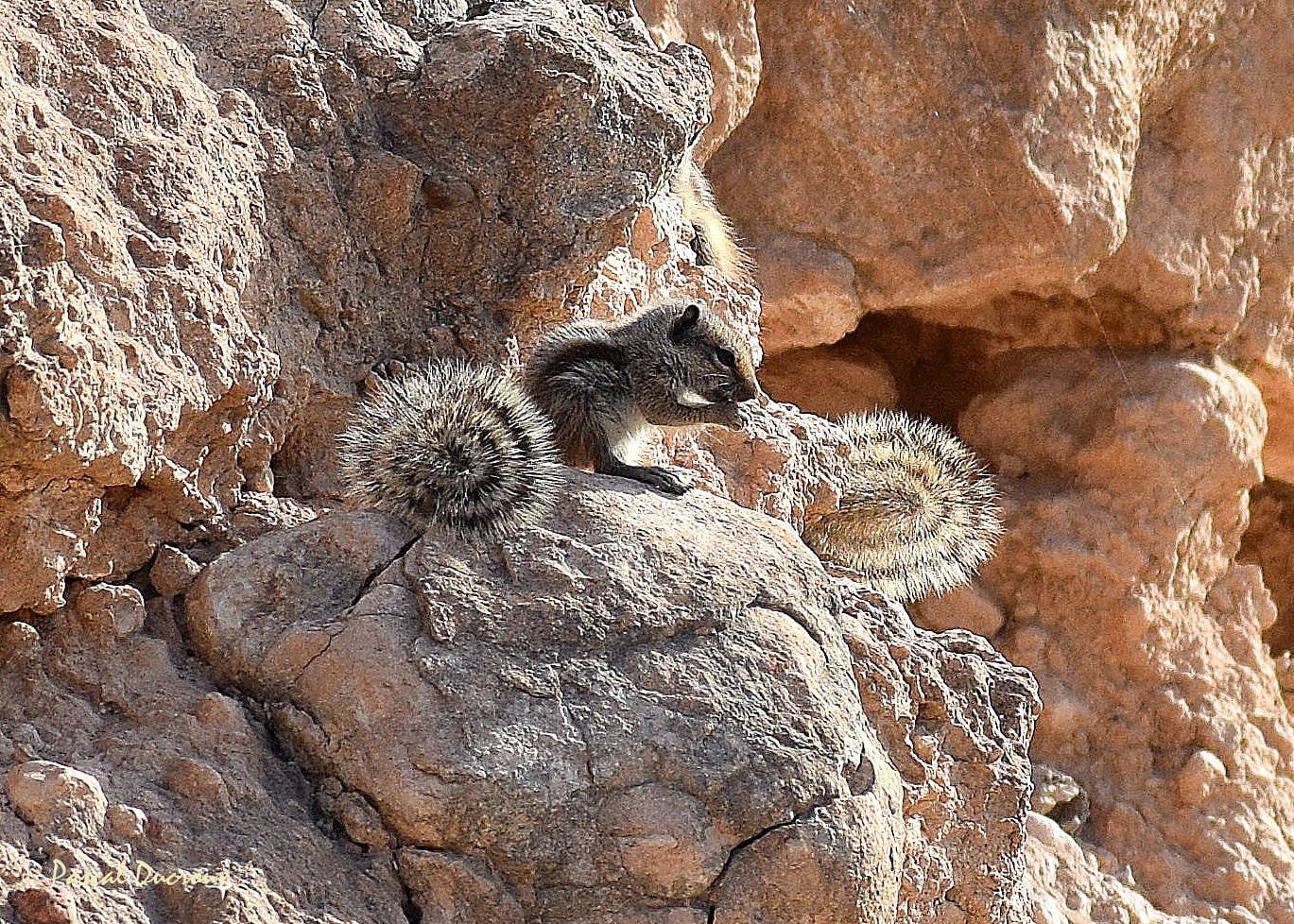
Barbary ground squirrel perched on rocky outcrop near Essaouira

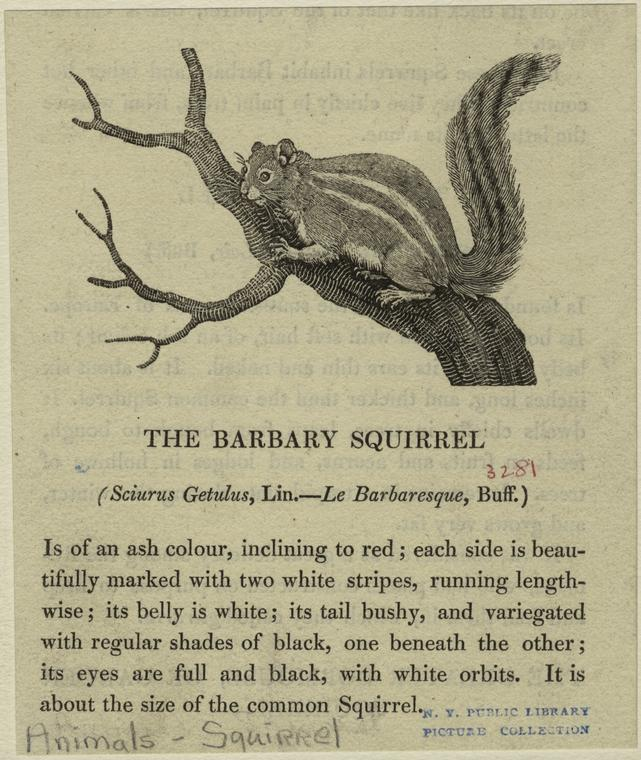
1820 illustration of the Barbary squirrel
