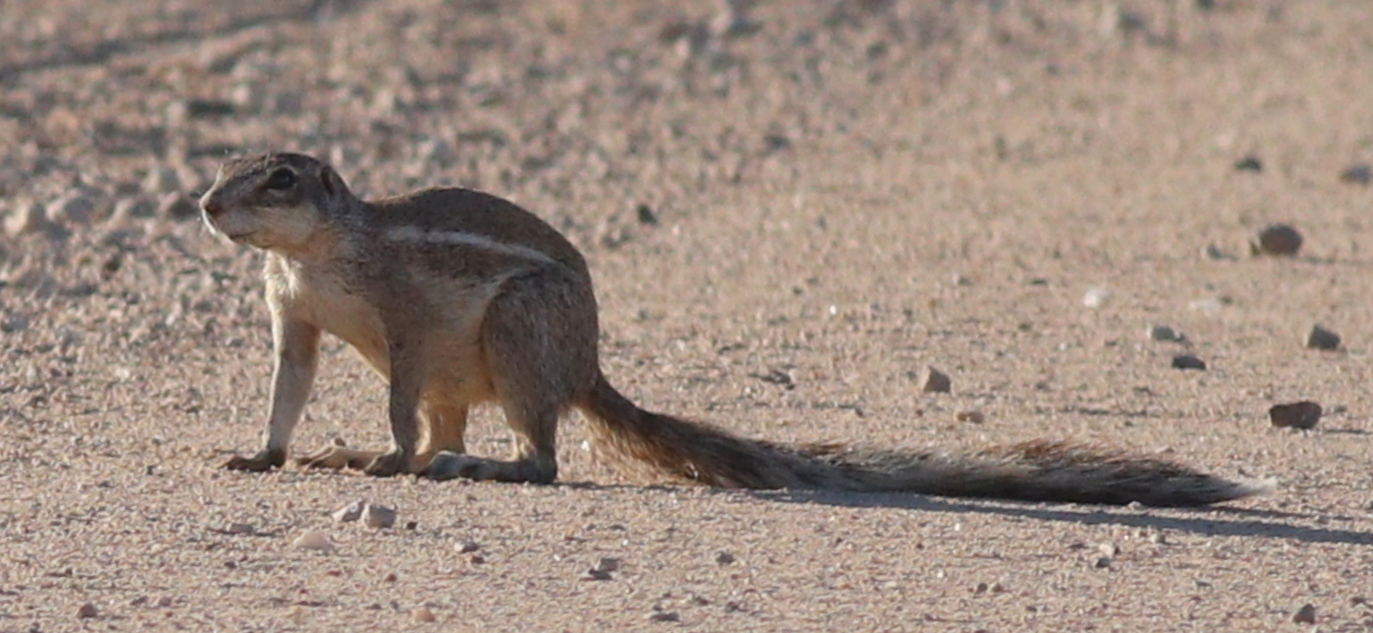

Conservation status
- Least Concern (IUCN 3.1)

Scientific classification
- Kingdom: Animalia
- Phylum: Chordata
- Class: Mammalia
- Order: Rodentia
- Family: Sciuridae
- Genus: Geosciurus
- Species: G. princeps

Binomial name
- Geosciurus princeps (Thomas, 1929)

Synonyms
- Xerus princeps

= Mountain ground squirrel =

Species of rodent

The mountain ground squirrel (Geosciurus princeps) is a rodent that is native to southwestern Angola, western Namibia, and western South Africa. It is also known as the Kaoko ground squirrel or the Damara ground squirrel.

It is the closest relative of the Cape ground squirrel (Latin name Geosciurus inauris), which is so similar in appearance that the two are difficult to distinguish in the field. Both species have long bushy black and white tails with a white stripe from the shoulder towards the rump. Geosciurus princeps is slightly larger, on average, than G. inauris, although there is considerable overlap in body size. Differences in skull morphology also distinguish the two species, and the incisors are yellow to orange rather than white as in G. inauris.

== Distribution ==
The mountain ground squirrel is restricted to a narrow band of the southwest arid region of Africa from southern Angola to southern Namibia and as far south as Richtersveld National Park.

== Description ==
The mountain ground squirrel is a large-bodied squirrel with small ears. The total length of head and body measures 23 to 29 cm (9.1 to 11.4 in), tail length from 21 to 28 cm (8.3 to 11.0 in), and weight ranges from 490 to 710 grams (1.1 to 1.6 lb). The body is covered in short, pale cinnamon brown hair, which changes to white on the belly, around the eyes, and on the front of the face. A white stripe extends from shoulders to hips. There is no underfur, and the skin is black. Tail hairs are white with three black stripes.

== Behavior ==
Mountain ground squirrels are strictly diurnal. Adult females may live alone or in small family groups, while males are mostly solitary. In contrast to the Cape Ground Squirrel, they are not known to exhibit play behaviors, allogrooming, or other social behaviors. They build burrows in areas with sparse cover. In the daytime, they may range up to 1 km (0.6 mi) from the home burrow in search of food.
