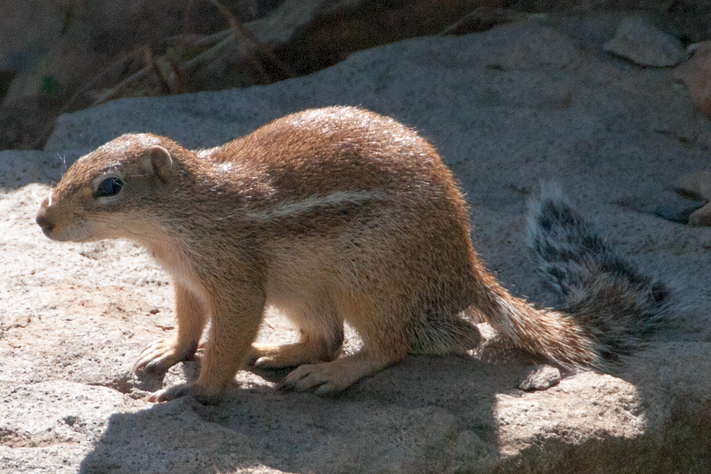

Conservation status
- Least Concern (IUCN 3.1)

Scientific classification
- Kingdom: Animalia
- Phylum: Chordata
- Class: Mammalia
- Infraclass: Placentalia
- Order: Rodentia
- Family: Sciuridae
- Tribe: Xerini
- Genus: Euxerus; Thomas, 1909
- Species: E. erythropus

Binomial name
- Euxerus erythropus (E. Geoffroy, 1803)

Synonyms
- Xerus erythropus

= African striped ground squirrel =

Striped ground squirrel

Species of rodent

The striped ground squirrel (Euxerus erythropus) is a species of squirrel native to Africa. It was first described by Geoffroy in 1803, but the binomial authority is sometimes incorrectly cited as "Desmarest, 1817". There are six subspecies. It is a moderately large ground squirrel with sandy-brown or dark-brown fur with a white lateral stripe and whitish underparts. Adults live alone or in pairs in a simple burrow with a central nest, foraging, mostly on the ground, for seeds, nuts and roots, and caching excess food under stones. This is a common species with a wide range and the International Union for Conservation of Nature has rated its conservation status as being of "least concern".

== Description ==
Striped ground squirrels are moderately large ground squirrels, ranging from 22 to 29 centimetres (8.7 to 11.4 in) in length, with a tail that, at 19 to 26 centimetres (7.5 to 10.2 in), is nearly as long as the body. Adults weigh between 0.5 and 1 kilogram (1.1 and 2.2 lb). They have a coat of short, bristly fur, and are pale sandy to dark brown across most of the body, with whitish, nearly hairless, underparts. A narrow stripe of pure white fur runs down the flanks from the shoulders to the hips. The tail has hairs much longer than those on the body, which fan out to the sides, and are multi-coloured along their length, presenting a grizzled appearance. The ears are small, and the muzzle long, with a projecting, almost pointed, nose. The limbs are pale, with large feet and long, straight, claws. They can be distinguished from the otherwise similar Cape and mountain ground squirrels by the fact that female striped ground squirrels possess three pairs of teats, rather than just two.

== Distribution and habitat ==
Striped ground squirrels are found across Africa south of the Sahara and north of the tropical rainforest. They are found from the Atlantic coast in the west to Ethiopia and Kenya in the east, being absent in the Horn of Africa. They inhabit open or disturbed forests and savannah country, often near cultivated land, and, at the extremes of their range, coastal scrubland and semidesert regions. Fossils attributed to the species have been identified from Pliocene Ethiopia.

Six subspecies are currently recognised:

- Euxerus erythropus erythropus - West Africa, from Mauritania to the Central African Republic, small relict population in Souss plains of Morocco
- E. e. chadensis - eastern Niger, Nigeria, and Cameroon, southern Chad, and central western Sudan
- E. e. lacustris - northern Congo
- E. e. leucombrinus - eastern Uganda, southeastern Sudan, Ethiopia, Eritrea, and northern Kenya
- E. e. limitaneus - southwestern Sudan, and neighbouring parts of Chad and the Central African Republic
- E. e. microdon - southern Kenya

== Biology and behaviour ==
Striped ground squirrels are diurnal herbivores, and spend almost their entire lives on the ground, although are capable of climbing into bushes to reach food. They eat a range of seeds, nuts, and roots, and can be an agricultural pest, eating crops such as cassava, yams, cotton bolls, peanuts, and sweet potatoes. They may occasionally supplement their diet with eggs, insects, and other small animals. Their predators include servals, jackals, birds of prey, and common puff adders.

They forage throughout home ranges of about 12 hectares (30 acres) in semi-arid terrain, but their ranges overlap and they make frequent forays into surrounding areas in search of food. They mark their territories using scent glands on their cheeks, which they rub onto stones and tree trunks, although they do not appear to defend them from intruders.

The squirrels spend the night in burrows, which they dig with their large claws. Their burrows are usually simple in structure, with a central nest less than a metre below the surface, a single entrance tunnel, and a few blind-ending tunnels that almost reach the surface. The latter are used as escape routes, allowing the squirrel to rapidly break through to the surface; the main entrance tunnel is often also blocked with a temporary pile of dirt at night. Burrows may also contain caches of food, although these are more commonly located some distance away and concealed beneath stones or dead leaves. They also bury their urine, but not their dung.

Striped ground squirrels live alone, or in pairs, and greet other members of their species by sniffing each other nose-to-nose. They move with a jumping gait, frequently pausing to sniff or look around, and making longer leaps when they need to move more quickly. They normally hold their tail horizontally when moving, or upright when still, and can fluff it up into a "bottle-brush" when alarmed. They can make a chattering sound, similar to that of other squirrels.

Courtship consists of chasing behaviour, and litters are of two to six young. They can live for up to six years in captivity.

== Status ==
The striped ground squirrel is a common species throughout most of its wide range. It is an adaptable species and no particular threats have been identified, and the International Union for Conservation of Nature has rated its conservation status as being of "least concern".
