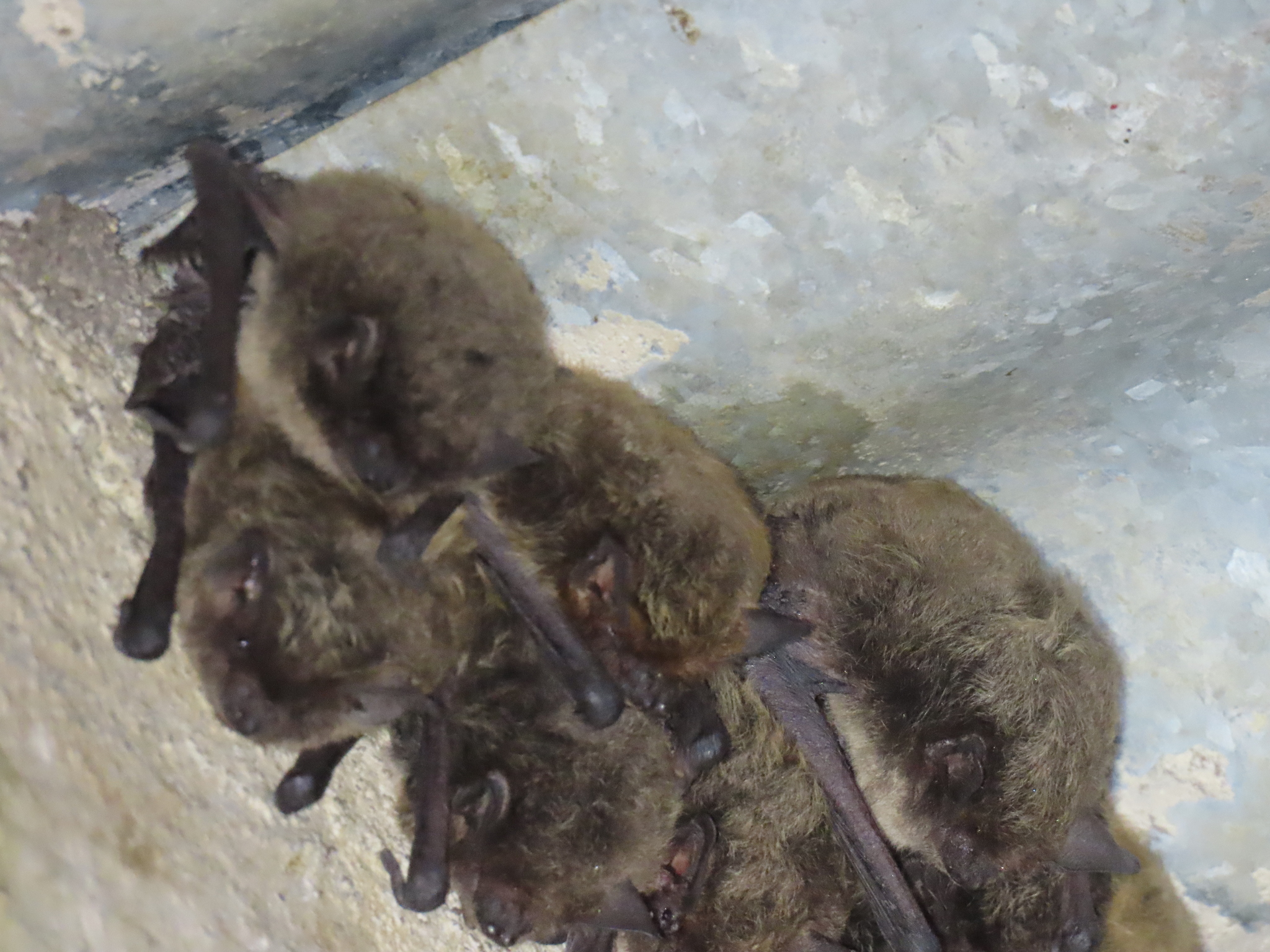
- Cistugo lesueuri

Scientific classification
- Kingdom: Animalia
- Phylum: Chordata
- Class: Mammalia
- Order: Chiroptera
- Superfamily: Vespertilionoidea
- Family: Cistugidae; Lack et al., 2010
- Genus: Cistugo; Thomas, 1912

Type species
- Myotis seabrai Thomas, 1912

Species
- 2 recognized species, see text
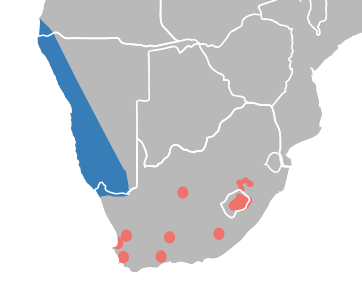
- Cistugo distribution C. lesueuri in red; C. seabrai in blue

= Cistugo =

Cistugo Temporal range: Late Eocene–present

Genus of bats

Cistugo is a genus of bats from southern Africa. The two species have historically been included in the genus Myotis (family Vespertilionidae), but molecular studies show that the genus is distinct from all other Vespertilionidae, and in fact distinctive enough to be placed in its own family, Cistugidae.

The two species are:

- Cistugo lesueuri Roberts, 1919 – Lesotho and southern South Africa
- Cistugo seabrai Thomas, 1912 – southwestern Angola through Namibia and northwestern South Africa

One fossil relative of Cistugo is also known in Chadronycteris Ostrander, 1983 from the Late Eocene of Nebraska, USA.

== Literature cited ==
- Lack, J.B., Roehrs, Z.P., Stanley, C.E., Ruedi, M. and Van Den Bussche, R.A. 2010. Molecular phylogenetics of Myotis indicate familial-level divergence for the genus Cistugo (Chiroptera) (subscription required). Journal of Mammalogy 91(4):976–992.
- Simmons, N.B. 2005. Order Chiroptera. Pp. 312–529 in Wilson, D.E. and Reeder, D.M. (eds.). Mammal Species of the World: A Taxonomic and Geographic Reference. 3rd ed. Baltimore: The Johns Hopkins University Press, 2 vols., 2142 pp. ISBN 978-0-8018-8221-0
