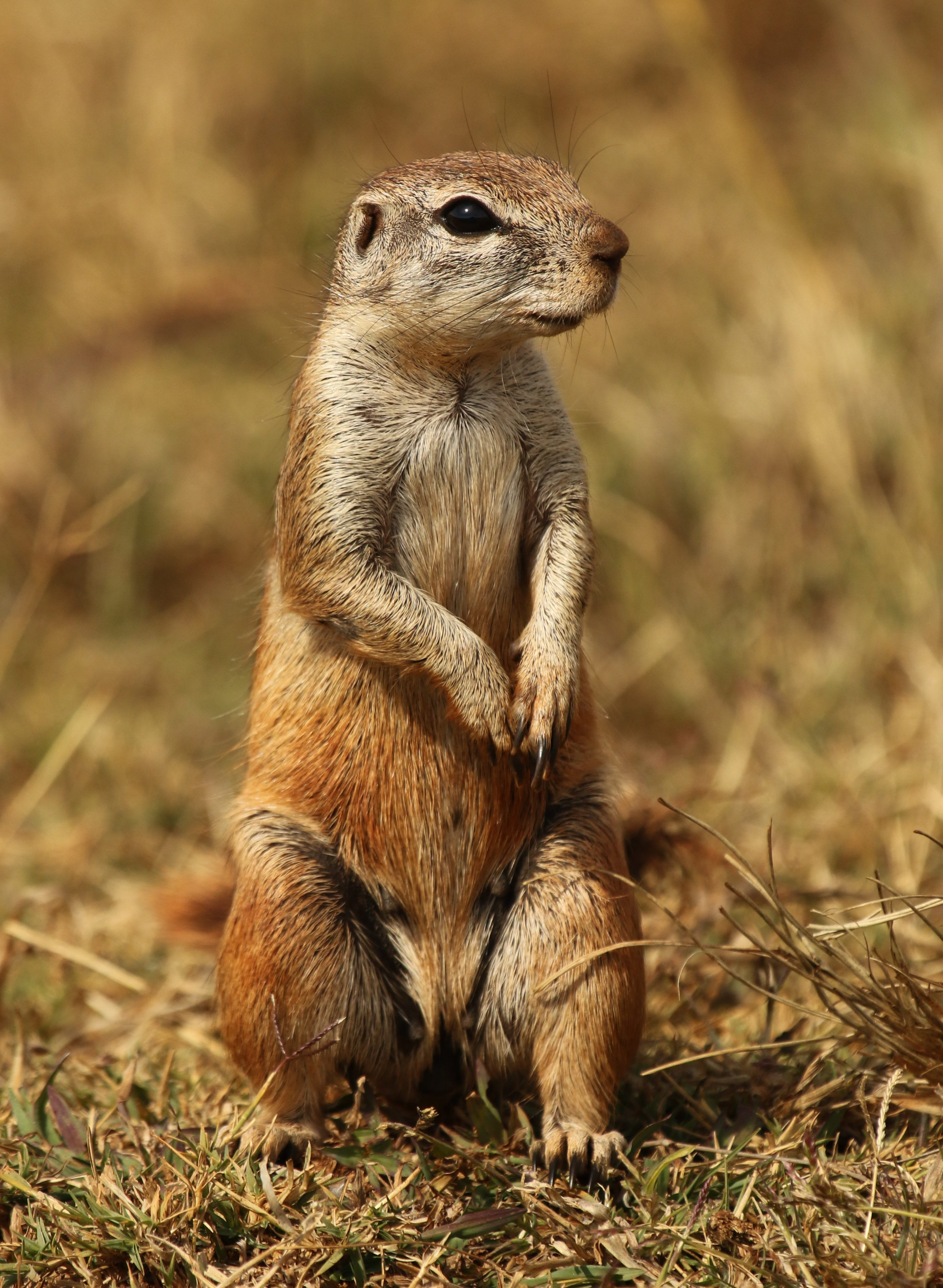
- At Krugersdorp Game Reserve, South Africa

Conservation status
- Least Concern (IUCN 3.1)

Scientific classification
- Kingdom: Animalia
- Phylum: Chordata
- Class: Mammalia
- Infraclass: Placentalia
- Order: Rodentia
- Family: Sciuridae
- Genus: Geosciurus
- Species: G. inauris

Binomial name
- Geosciurus inauris (Zimmerman, 1780)
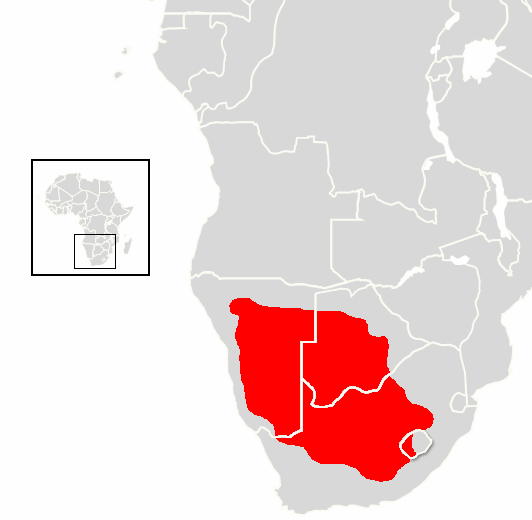
- Cape ground squirrel range

Synonyms
- Xerus inauris

= Cape ground squirrel =

Species of mammal

The Cape ground squirrel or South African ground squirrel (Geosciurus inauris) is found in most of the drier parts of southern Africa from South Africa, through to Botswana, and into Namibia, including Etosha National Park.

The name Cape ground squirrel is somewhat misleading as it actually has a much wider area of habitation. This common name may have been arrived at to distinguish it from a tree squirrel (the eastern grey squirrel) found around Cape Town, which was imported from Europe by Cecil John Rhodes.

The species has also been known as the fan-tailed squirrel.

== Description ==
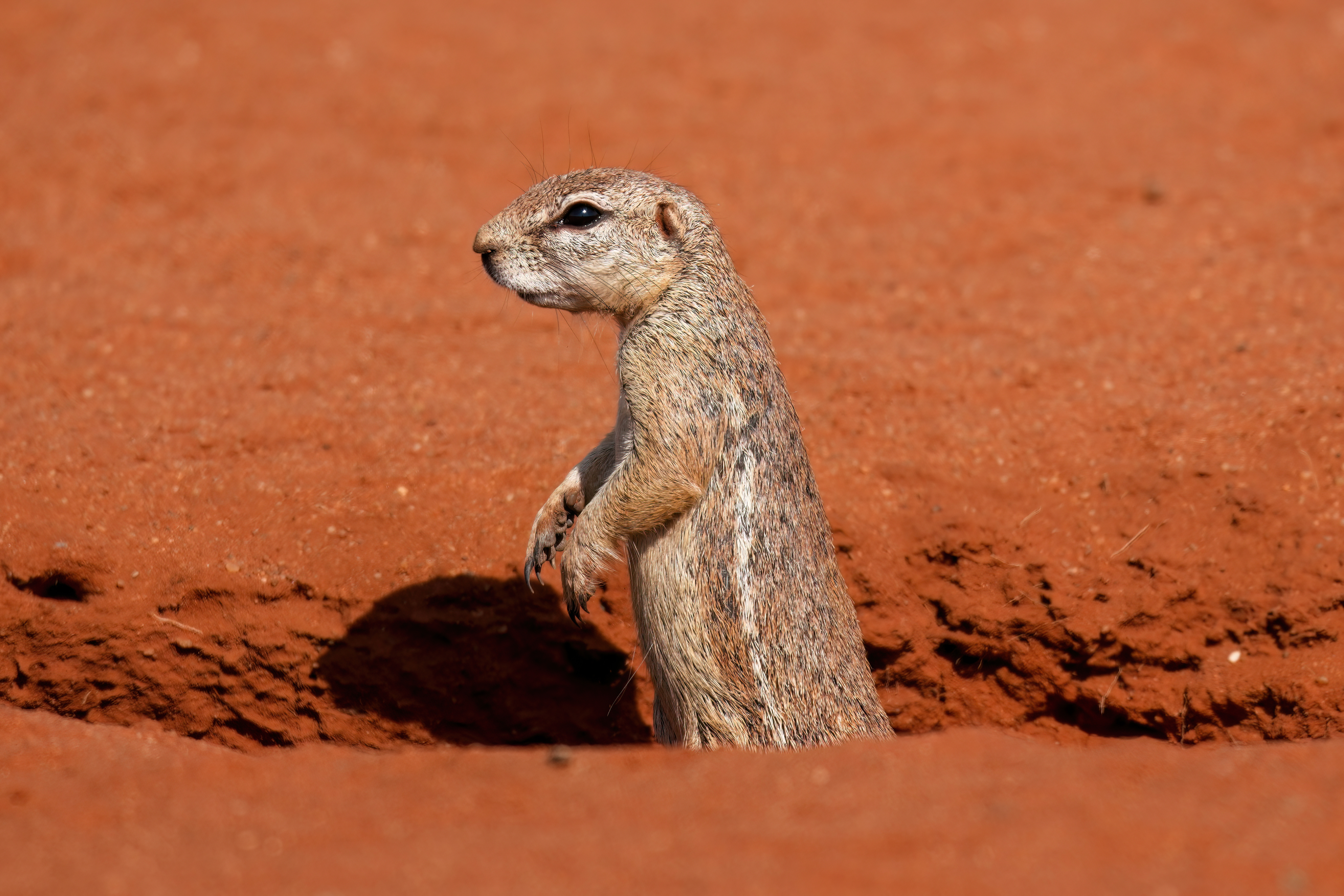
Cape ground squirrel looking out of its burrow

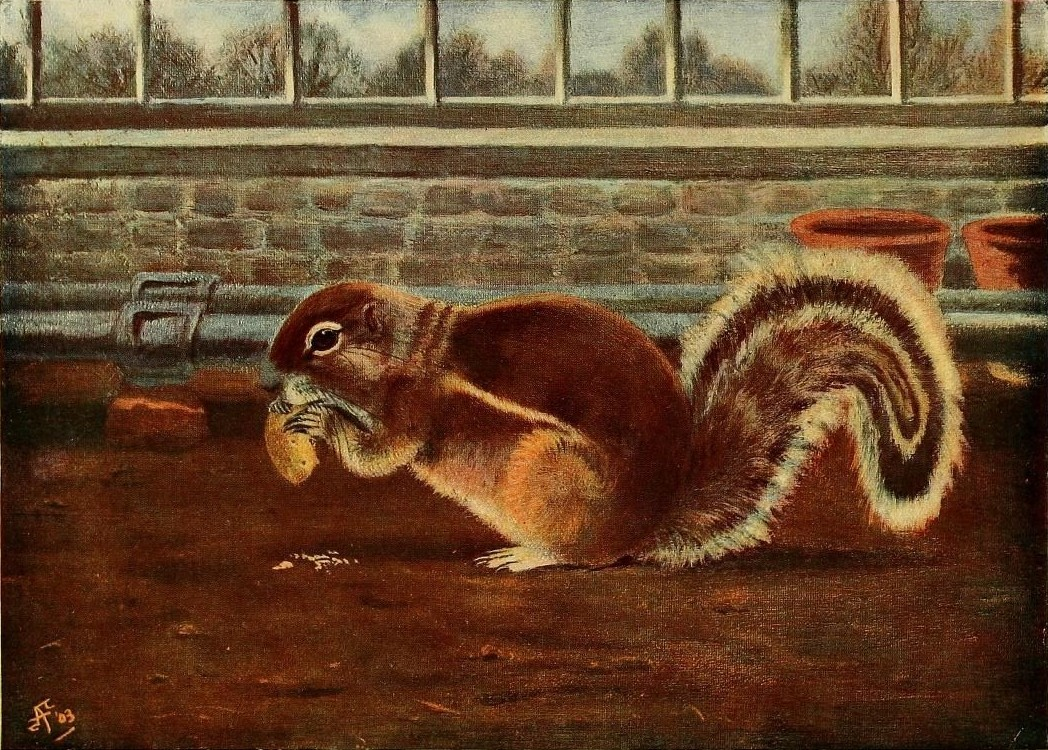
The Fan-tailed Squirrel. From an original painting by the Hon. Alice Foljambe

The Cape ground squirrel has black skin with a coat made of short stiff hairs without underfur. The fur is cinnamon on the back while the face, underbelly, sides of neck and ventral sides of limbs are white. The sides of its body each have a white stripe that stretches from the shoulders to the thighs. The eyes are fairly large and have white lines around them. The pinnae are small. The tail is flattened on the back and underside and is covered with white hair and two black bands at the base. The Cape ground's sexual dimorphism is subtle. Males usually weigh 423–649 grams (0.933–1.431 lb), 8 to 12 percent more than females at 444–600 grams (0.979–1.323 lb). Male Cape ground squirrels have a total length of 424–476 millimetres (16.7–18.7 in), while females are 435–446 millimetres (17.1–17.6 in) long. The dental formula of the ground squirrel is 1.1.0.01.1.3.3. The belly and groin area of the females each have two pairs of mammary glands. The glans penis of the males are large with a prominent baculum. This species is notable for its impressively large testicles, which are roughly golf ball size, around 20% of the length of the head and body. Moulting occurs in the period from August and September to March and April, once per year.

== Distribution ==
The Cape ground squirrel is widespread in southern Africa; through Botswana, South Africa, Lesotho, and Namibia. Its range covers most of Namibia but is absent from coastal regions and the northwest. Ground squirrels inhabit central and southwestern Kalahari in Botswana. In South Africa, it can be found in central and north-central areas.

== Behaviour and ecology ==
Cape ground squirrels live mainly in arid or semiarid areas. They prefer to live in veld and grasslands with hard ground. They can also be found in scrub along pans, on floodplains and in agricultural areas. Ground squirrel are generally active during the day and do not hibernate. They are burrowing animals that dig and live in clusters of burrows averaging around 700 square metres (7,500 sq ft) with 2-100 entrances. Burrows serve to protect the squirrel from extreme temperatures at the surface as well as predators. Nevertheless, most of the day is spent feeding at the surface. Squirrels shade their head and back with their bushy tails, which was originally thought to be important for thermoregulation. However, research has revealed that tail raising does not actually decrease core body temperature and seems to mostly serve as a way for squirrels to cool the skin and increase their thermal comfort as they forage in the hot sun in between visits to their burrows. Burrowing has been shown to reduce the squirrel's core body temperature by a few degrees Celsius. Squirrels tend to leave the burrows earlier in the morning in the summer months to avoid the heat, and in the winter months their core body temperature increases rapidly upon exiting their burrows. Dust bathing is also done.

Ground squirrels eat bulbs, fruits, grasses, herbs, insects and shrubs. They forage daily and do not hoard food. The Cape ground squirrel usually does not need to drink as it gets sufficient moisture from its food. A ground squirrel's daily activities are made of around 70% feeding, 15-20% being vigilant and around 10% socializing. The squirrels use the position of the sun as an orientation marker to hide and recover their food.

The burrows of Cape ground squirrels are also used by meerkats and yellow mongooses. While Cape ground squirrels and meerkats appear to have a mutual relationship, mongoose and squirrel relations appear to be more commensal. Predators of ground squirrels include jackals, snakes and monitor lizards. Ground squirrels may be able to scent the differences in the dropping of predators and non-predators. When threatened by predators ground squirrels engage in mobbing behaviour: several squirrels rush at the predator while using their bushy tails to block it. When the predator strikes back, all the squirrels back off. However, multiple mobbings are usually successful in driving away predators.

=== Social behaviour ===
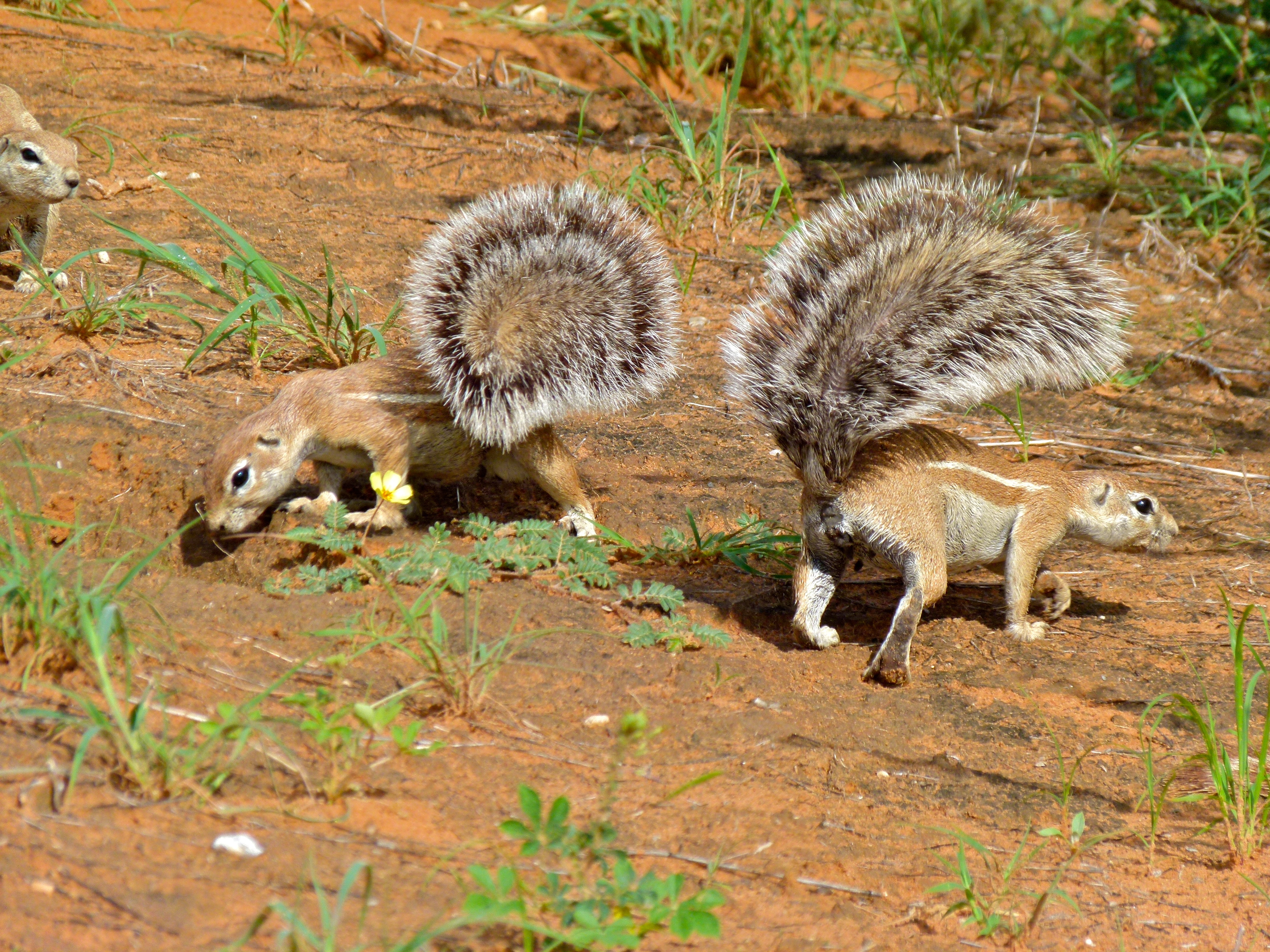
Cape ground squirrels live in groups of two to three adult females and a maximum of nine sub-adults of either sex

Cape ground squirrels live in groups of two to three adult females and a maximum of nine sub-adults of either sex as well as the females' dependent offspring. Groups that have more than three females split into smaller groups. Adult males live separately from females and only join when the females are in estrus. Male groups number up to 19 unrelated individuals, which are not agonistic. Within a male group, four to five males may form temporary subgroups that change size and members each day. Female groups live in separate burrow clusters. A female group's home range is c. 4 hectares (9.9 acres) with core areas of around 0.25 hectares (0.62 acres). Home ranges can overlap. Core areas are defended by agonistic behaviour. Male groups live in home ranges envelop those of several female groups and average 12.1 hectares (30 acres). Within a female group there is no dominance hierarchy, and members use the same feeding and sleeping ranges. Male groups, by contrast, live in ages-based linear hierarchies. Competition between males usually takes the form of leaping displays that cause no injuries. Unlike female groups, male groups are not territorial, and membership is very open. During oestrus, a female will be approached, solicited and chased by males trying to mate with her. The most dominant males get the first matings. A female will mate with the same male several times. If a male has not yet mated with a female, he will disrupt the copulations she has with other males. However, mate guarding is rare.

=== Communication ===
When perceiving something as a threat, ground squirrels will emit a whistle-like call as an alarm call. The alarm call comes in two forms; the short and shrill "bi-jo" which signals serious danger, and a medium-pitched "bi-joo" sound which is used for lesser dangers. During antagonistic encounters, squirrels emit deep growls as signs of aggression. Juvenile squirrels make play calls, nest-chirpings, and protest squeaks.

=== Reproduction ===
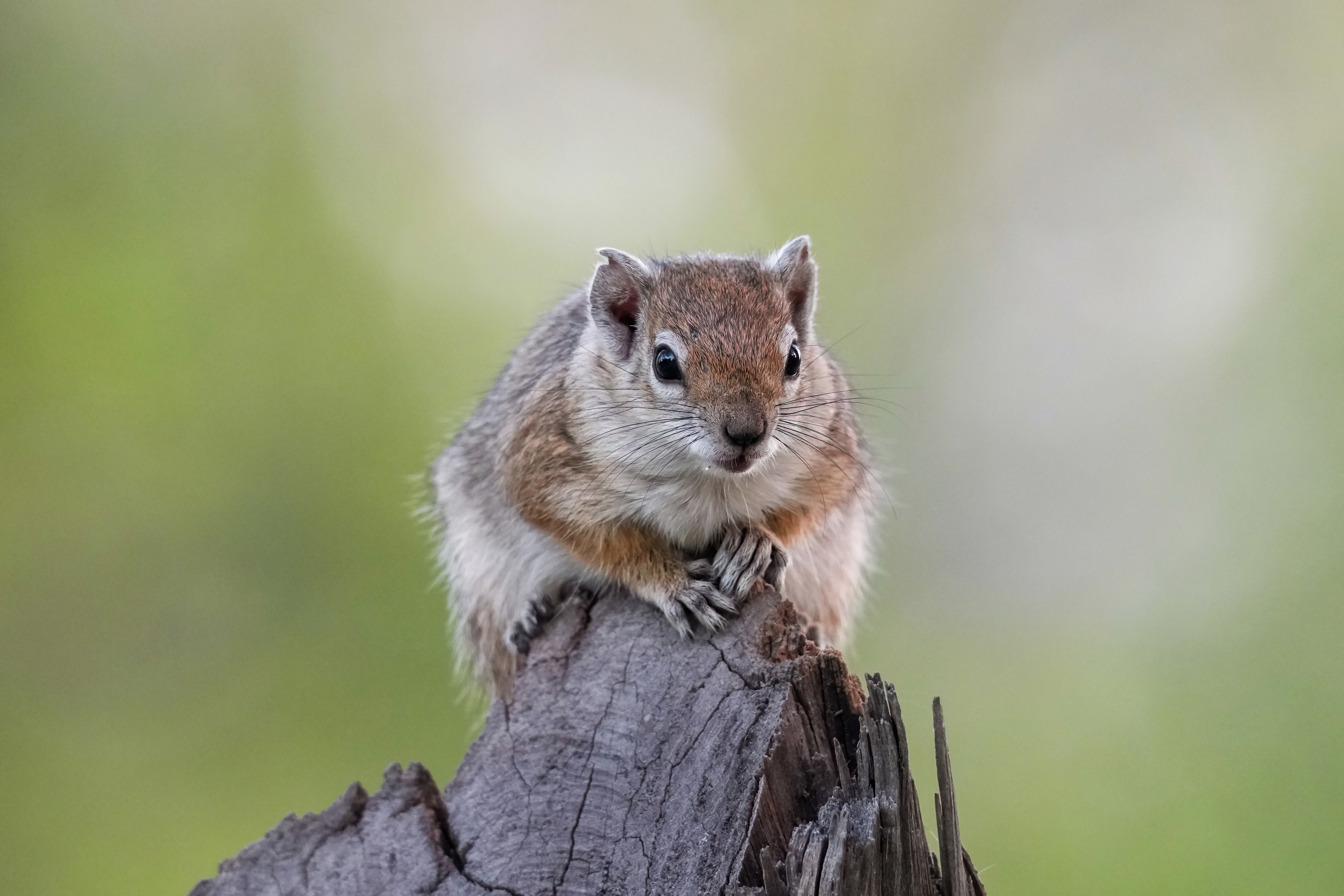
Cape ground squirrel on a tree

Cape ground squirrel mate and reproduce year-round but mating occurs mostly in dry winter months. Since females copulate with multiple males, the males' large testes are useful for sperm competition. After copulation, males will masturbate, which could serve to keep the genitals clean and reduce the risk of sexually transmitted infections. In groups, only one female at a time enters oestrus which lasts around three hours. Gestation lasts around 48 days or 42–49 days. Lactation begins not long before the pups are born. A lactating female isolates herself in a separate burrow to care for their young but she returns to her group after weaning or if her litter is lost for some reason. There are 1-3 pups in a litter. They are born altricial, hairless and blind. The pups stay in the burrows for their first 45 days. By 35 days, the eyes are open. Seven days after emerging from the burrows, the pups can eat solid food. Lactation ends at around 52 days. Males reach sexual maturity at eight months while female mature at 10 months. The former leave their natal groups while the latter remain.

== Status ==
The Cape ground squirrels populations does not seem to be threatened overall. In some areas, it is persecuted as an agricultural pest. In addition, humans have used poisonous grass to control ground squirrel due to crop damage and rabies. It inhabits protected areas, such as Kgalagadi Transfrontier Park in Botswana and South Africa and Etosha National Park in Namibia.

== Gallery ==
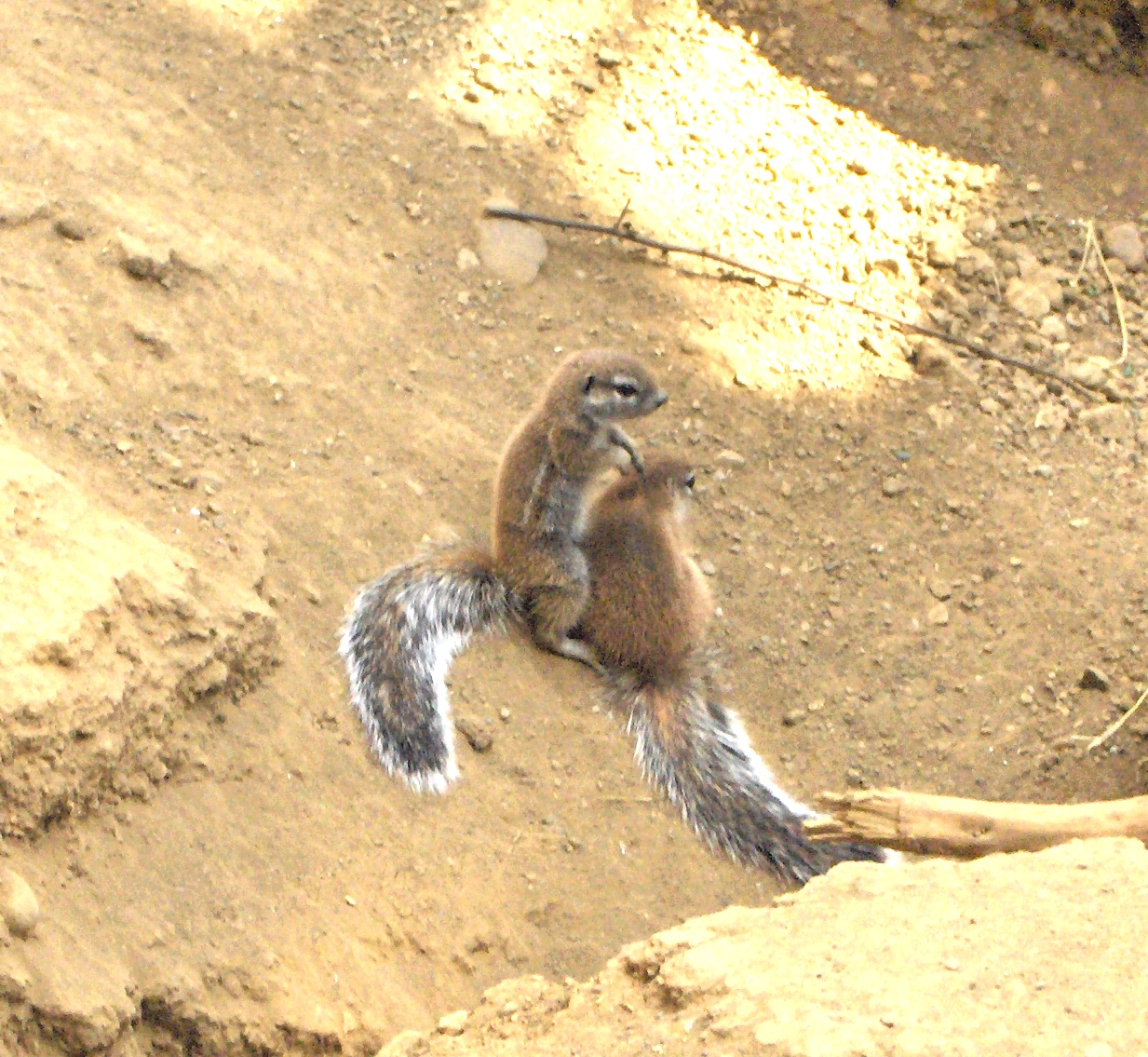
Young Cape ground squirrels

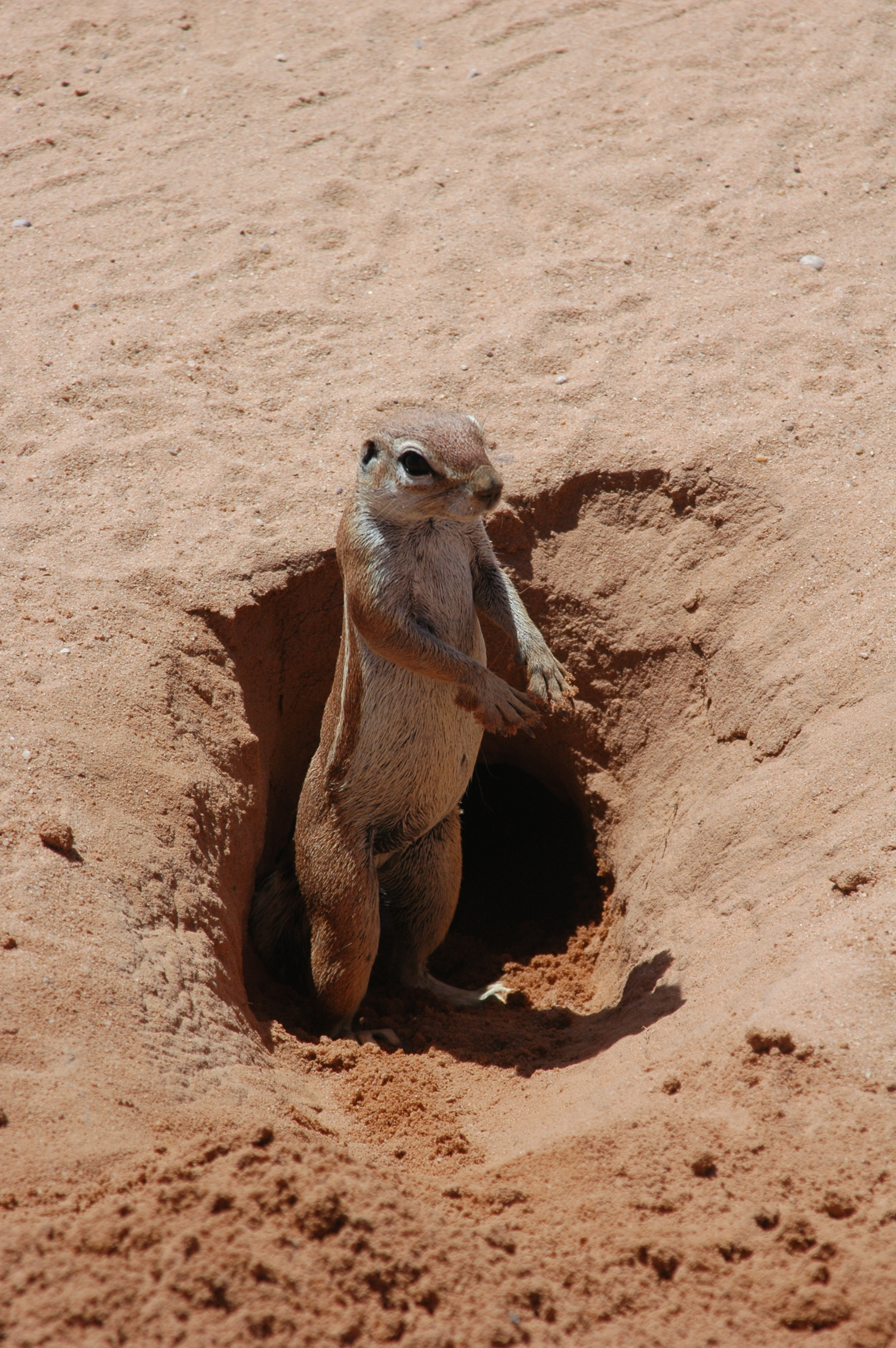
Ground squirrel at burrow entrance

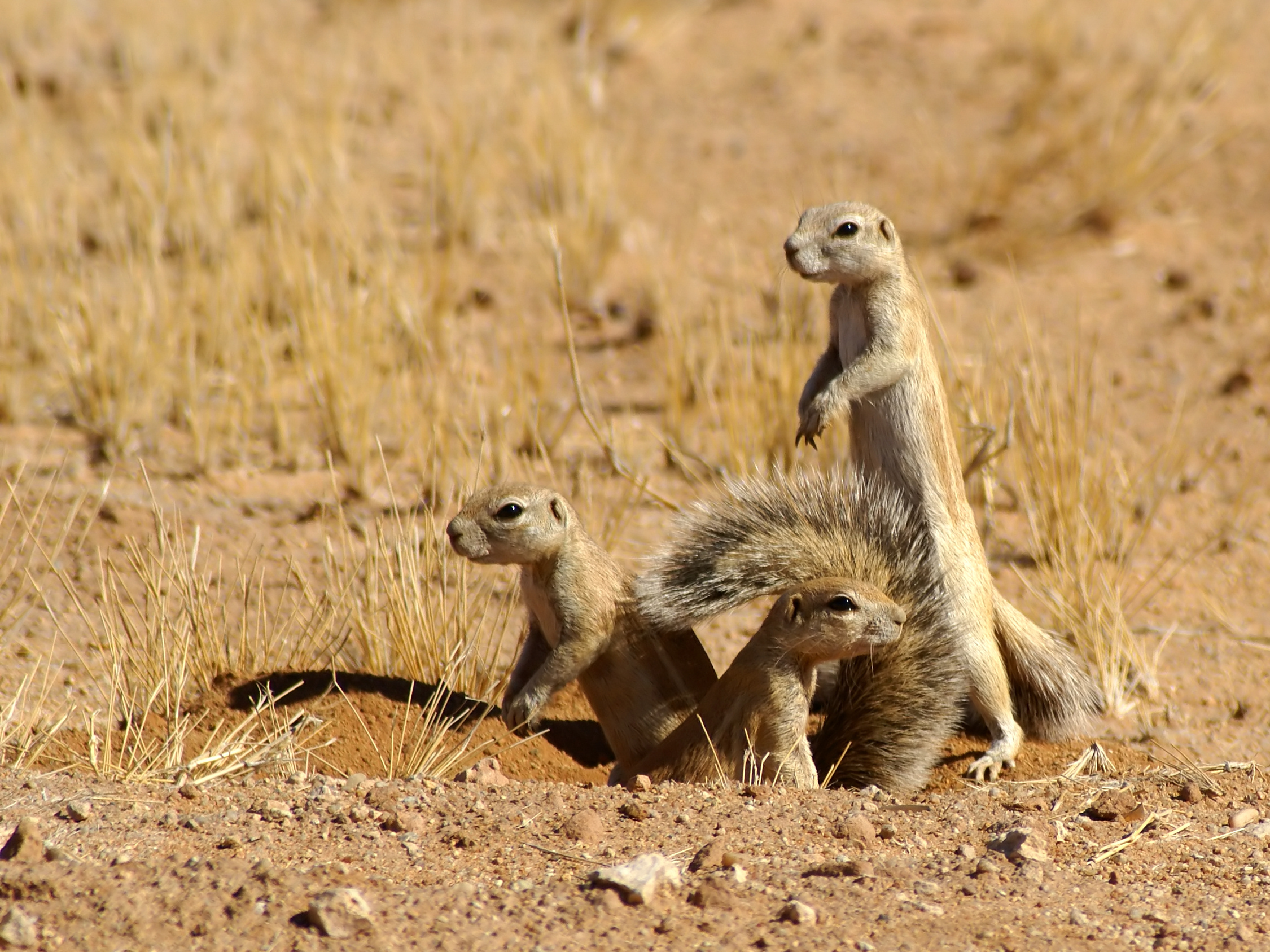
Cape ground squirrels

Male eating, Tswalu Kalahari Reserve, South Africa
