= Eberhard August Wilhelm von Zimmermann =

German geographer and zoologist

- Born: 17 August 1743; Uelzen , Lower Saxony, Germany
- Died: 4 July 1815 (aged 71); Braunschweig
- Education: Leiden, Halle, Berlin, Göttingen
- Known for: Specimen Zoologiae Geographicae Quadrupedum (1777)
- Scientific career
- Fields: Mathematics, geography, zoology
- Workplaces: Collegium Carolinum in Braunschweig
- Notable students: Carl Friedrich Gauss
- Author abbrev. (zoology): Zimmermann

Eberhard August Wilhelm von Zimmermann (August 17, 1743, Uelzen – July 4, 1815, Braunschweig) was a German geographer and zoologist.

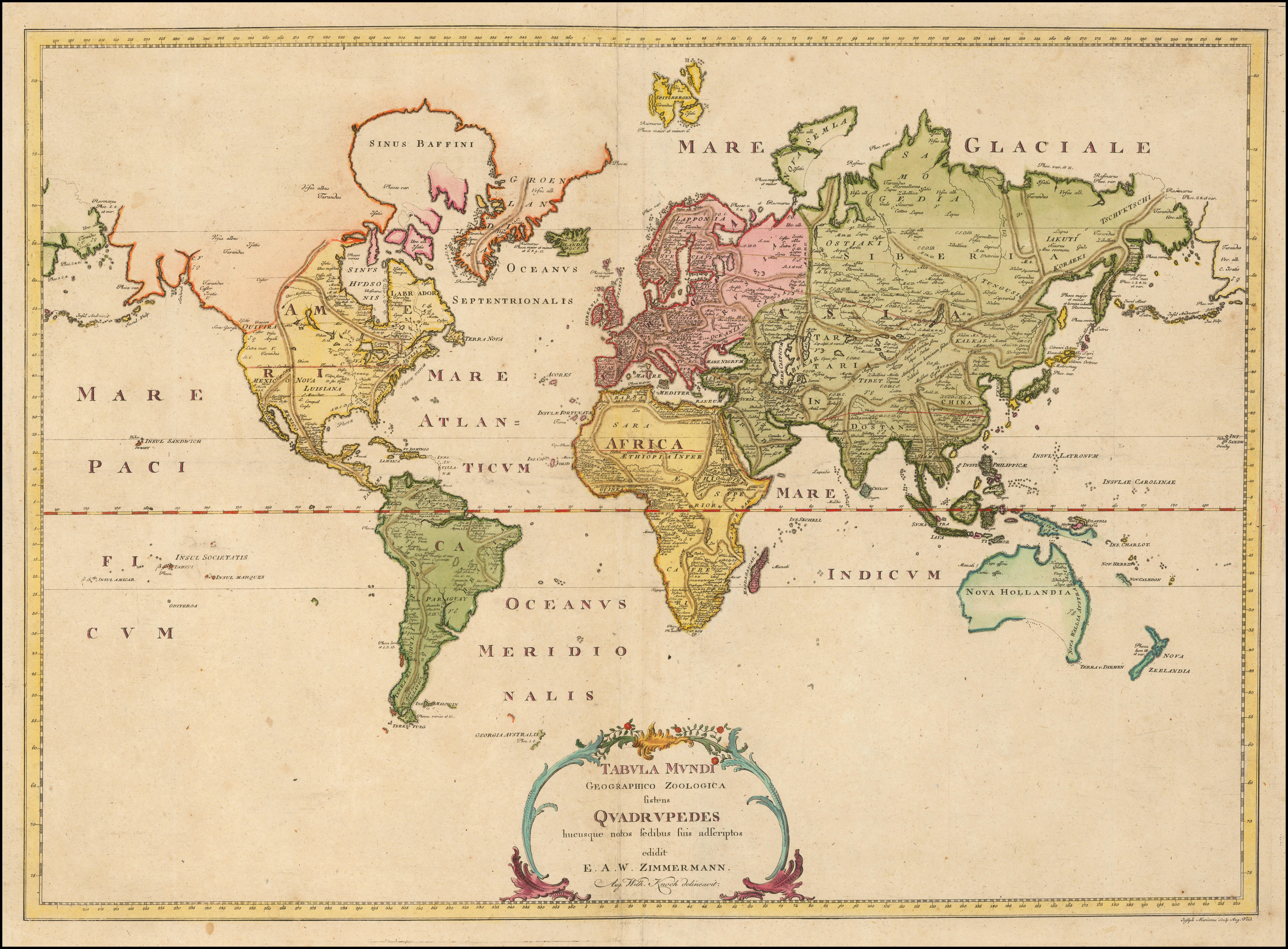
Zimmermann's 1783 map of the world showing the distribution of mammals

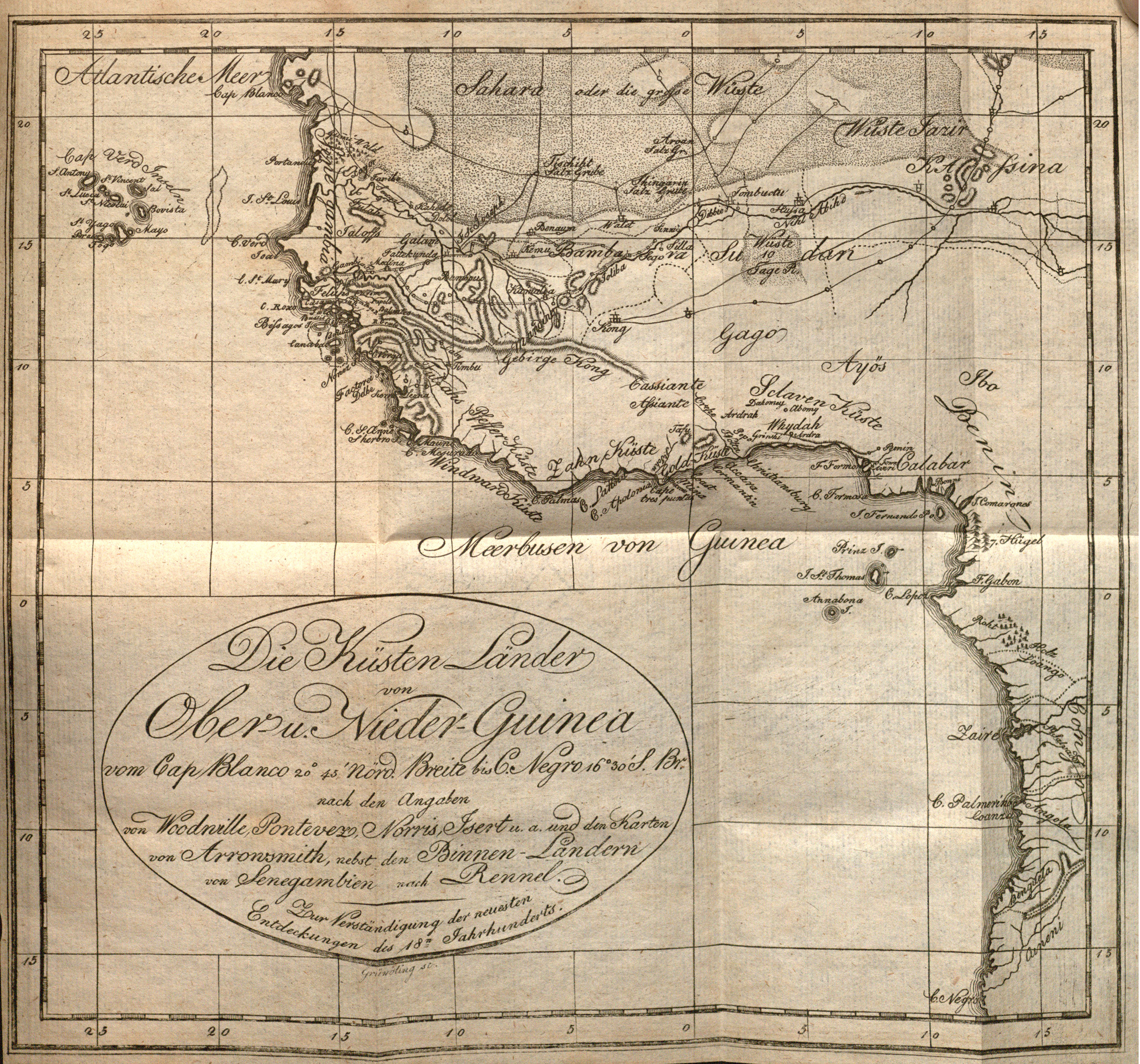
Zimmermann's Die Küsten Länder von Ober- u. Nieder-Guinea, 1802

He studied natural philosophy and mathematics in Leiden, Halle, Berlin, and Göttingen, and in 1766, was appointed professor of mathematics and natural sciences at the Collegium Carolinum in Braunschweig. One of his pupils was mathematician Carl Friedrich Gauss. From 1789 onward, he served as aulic councillor in Braunschweig.

During his career, he travelled widely throughout Europe — Livonia, Russia, Sweden, Denmark, England, France, Germany, Switzerland, and Italy. On his journeys, he conducted research of economic conditions and natural resources. He wrote Specimen Zoologiae Geographicae Quadrupedum (1777), one of the first works on the geographical distribution of mammals (zoogeography).

In 1794, he was elected to the American Philosophical Society in Philadelphia, Pennsylvania.

He was the author of works on a variety of subjects, such as mathematics, natural sciences, regional studies, and the history of discovery. From 1802 to 1813, he published the Taschenbuch der Reisen (Handbook of Travel).

== Published works ==
- Geographische Geschichte des Menschen und der allgemein verbreiteten vierfüssigen Thiere, 3 volumes (1779–1783) – [Geographical history of humans and the general distribution of quadrupeds].
- Über die Elastizität des Wassers, 1779 – [On the elasticity of water].
- Voyage a la nitrière naturelle qui se trouve à Molfetta dans la terre de Bari en Pouille. Venice: Jacque Storti. 1790. p. 1.
- Frankreich und die Freistaaten von Nordamerika, (part I, 1795; part II, 1800) – [France and the free states of North America].
- Die Erde und ihre Bewohner. Ein Lesebuch für Geographie, Völkerkunde, Produktenlehre und den Handel, 5 volumes (1810–1814) – [The earth and its inhabitants. A reading book of geography, ethnology, etc.].
