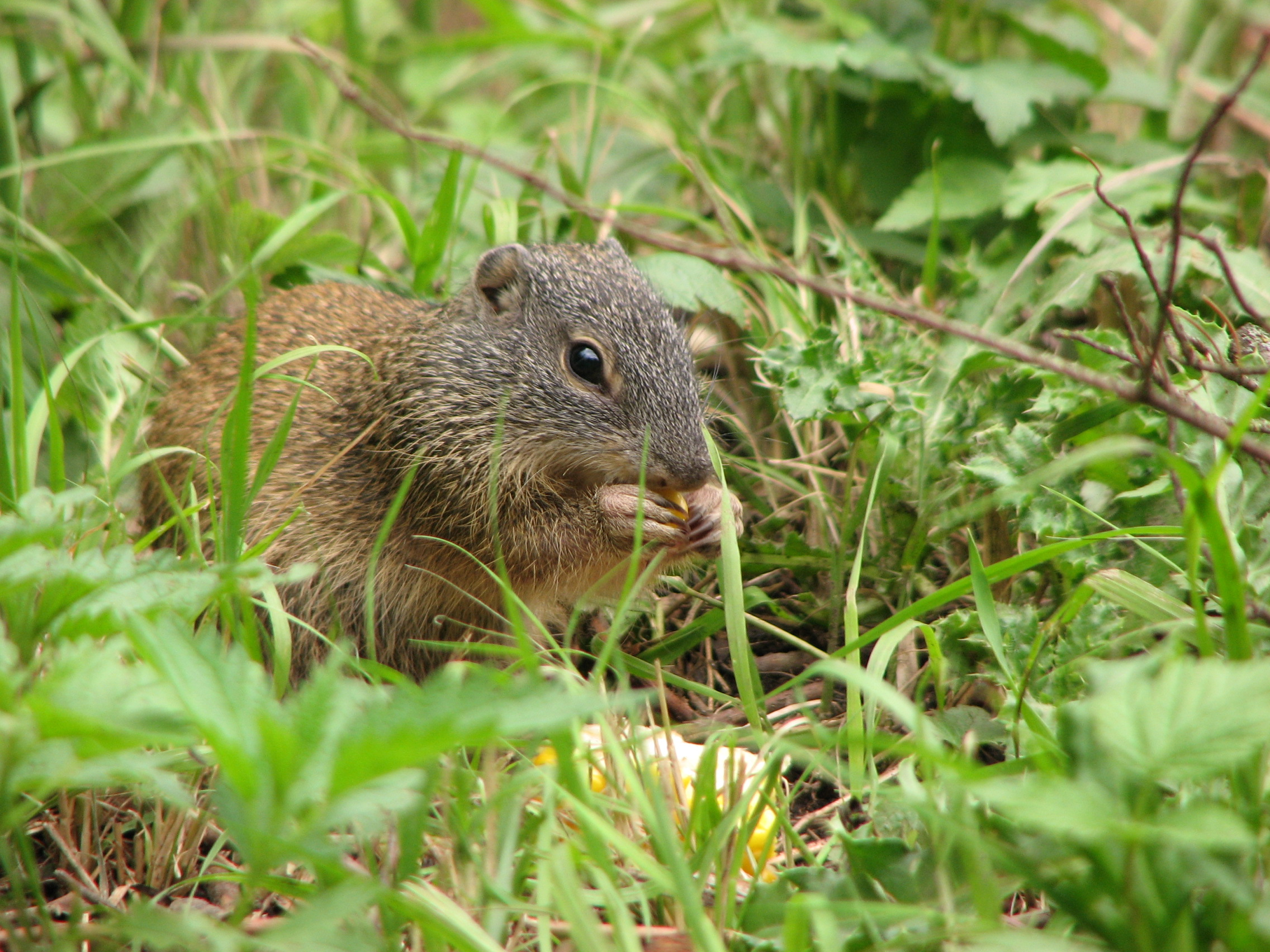
- In Alberta, Canada

Conservation status
- Least Concern (IUCN 3.1)

Scientific classification
- Kingdom: Animalia
- Phylum: Chordata
- Class: Mammalia
- Infraclass: Placentalia
- Order: Rodentia
- Family: Sciuridae
- Subfamily: Xerinae
- Tribe: Marmotini
- Genus: Poliocitellus; Howell, 1938
- Species: P. franklinii

Binomial name
- Poliocitellus franklinii (Sabine, 1822)

Synonyms
- Spermophilus franklinii Citellus franklinii

= Franklin's ground squirrel =

Species of rodent

Franklin's ground squirrel (Poliocitellus franklinii) is a species of squirrel native to North America, and the only member of the genus Poliocitellus. Due to the destruction of prairie, the populations of Franklin's ground squirrel have dwindled, approaching levels of concern. Its decline in the eastern portion of its range is mostly attributed to habitat fragmentation.

== Taxonomy ==
Franklin's ground squirrel was first described by Joseph Sabine in 1822, who named it in honor of the British Arctic explorer Sir John Franklin. It was formerly placed in the large ground squirrel genus Spermophilus, in its own subgenus, Poliocitellus, but since DNA sequencing of the cytochrome b gene has shown Spermophilus to be paraphyletic it is now placed in its own genus. Franklin's ground squirrel is suggested to be sister to a clade containing not only the Mohave, round-tailed, spotted, and Perote ground squirrels (genus Xerospermophilus), but the prairie dogs as well. There are no commonly recognized subspecies.

== Description ==
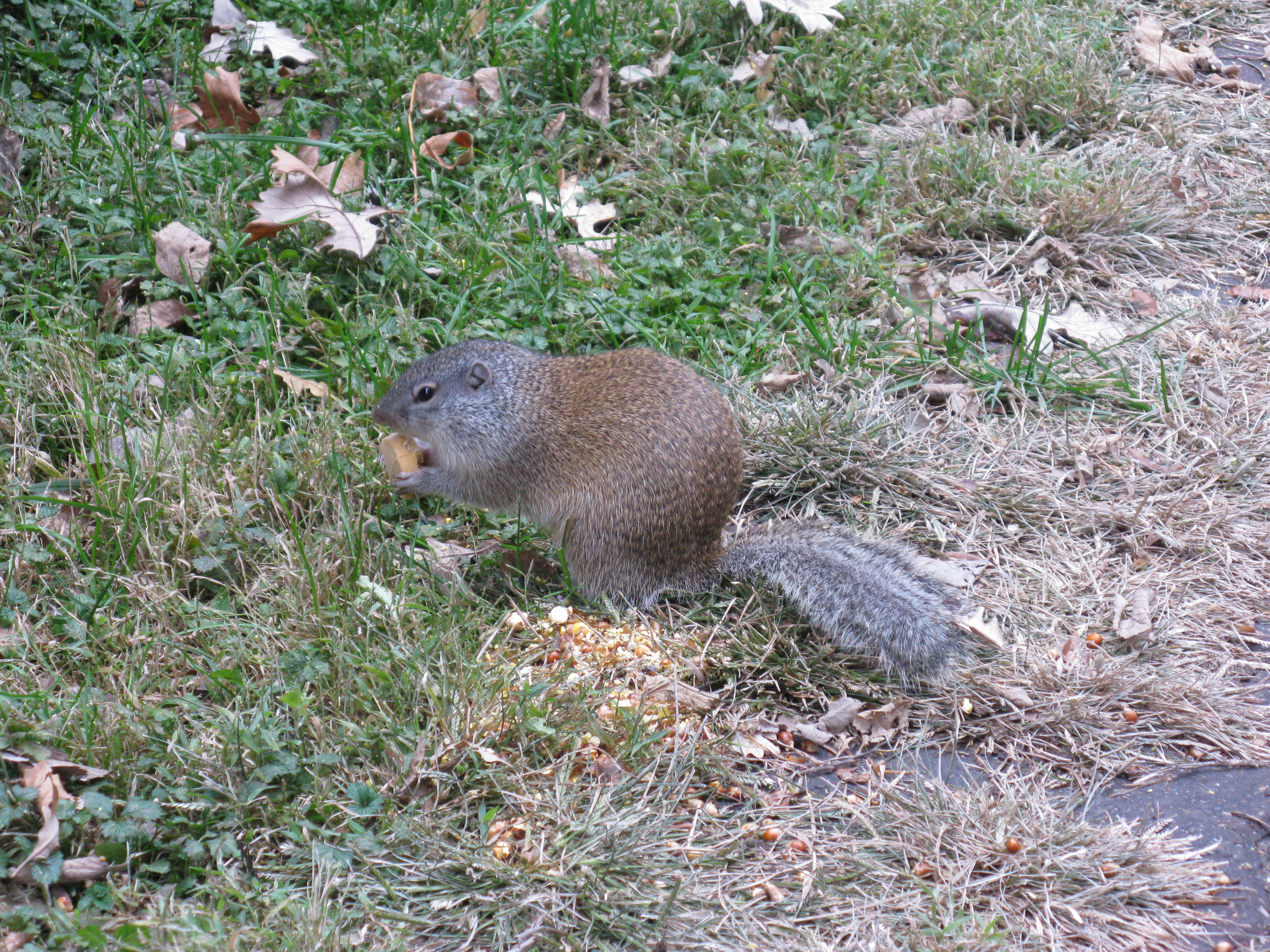
In Lincoln, Nebraska

Franklin's ground squirrel is a typically sized squirrel, with adults measuring from 36 to 41 cm (14 to 16 in) in total length, including the 11 to 15 cm (4.3 to 5.9 in) tail. Males weigh about 370 g (13 oz) in the spring, and up to 950 g (34 oz) in the fall. In comparison, females are significantly lighter, and put on proportionally less weight through the year, being about 320 g (11 oz) in the spring, and up to 760 g (27 oz) in the fall. The fur is brownish grey marked with both light and dark speckles, and fades to yellowish white on the animal's underside. The tail is darker, almost blackish in color, while the head is a relatively solid grey.

In many respects, Franklin's squirrel closely resembles the common eastern grey squirrel. However, it has a shorter, less bushy tail, shorter ears, longer claws, and a patch of slightly yellowish fur on the rump, which the eastern grey lacks. Other local squirrels with which it might be confused include Richardson's ground squirrel, which is more built, and has a longer tail, and the Columbian ground squirrel, which has noticeably reddish fur.

The squirrel has a number of scent glands. There are small glands at the corners of the mouth, which appear to be used when greeting other members of the same species, and a number of glands running from the shoulders down to the pelvis, which may be used to mark burrows. The largest glands, however, are the three anal glands, one above the anus, and one either side. These produce a musky scent during the mating season, and are found in both sexes.

== Distribution and habitat ==
Franklin's ground squirrel is found from central Alberta to southern Manitoba in Canada, and in the United States from North Dakota and Minnesota as far south as northern Kansas to northwestern Indiana. Within this region, it inhabits tallgrass prairies where there is dense vegetation cover, often along the boundaries of woodland or marsh.

Range map

== Biology ==
Franklin's ground squirrel is omnivorous, feeding mainly on vegetation in the spring and late summer, but with meat and eggs forming a significant proportion of their diet in the early summer. In the spring, they feed on roots, new shoots, and grasses, shifting to leaves and flowers, and then to fruit and seeds as the year progresses. Plants eaten include dandelion, stinging nettle, red-berried elder, white clover, and wild peas, as well as garden vegetables. Animal material consumed ranges from insects to eggs, small rodents, fish and frogs, up to rabbits and even fully-grown mallards.

The squirrel hibernates from about August to April, although this varies between individuals. Males typically enter hibernation earlier than females, and adults earlier than young-of-the-year, which need more time to build up fat reserves. Badgers are the main predators of Franklin's ground squirrels, although they are also eaten by coyotes, foxes, weasels, hawks, and snakes.

The mating season begins as soon as the squirrels emerge from their burrows in the spring, and continues until June, during which time pairs may often share a burrow. Gestation lasts 28 days. Litters may be of anything from two to thirteen pups, with eight being average. The young are born naked and blind, with their eyes only opening after 18 to 20 days. They are weaned by 30 days of age. Females do not become sexually mature until their second year, but can live for four to five years, while males typically do not survive beyond the age of two.

== Behavior ==
Franklin's ground squirrel is diurnal, spending the night in burrows, typically built on steep slopes. The burrows are about 8 cm (3.1 in) in diameter, and extend on average 43 cm (17 in) below ground. They consist of a single nesting chamber lined with dried plant matter, and a number of side tunnels leading to food storage areas and latrines. Burrows typically have two or three entrances.

Each burrow is home to only one or two squirrels during the spring and summer, when the animals are generally antisocial. In North Dakota, males have an average home range of 24 hectares (59 acres) and females 9 ha (22 acres), although the home ranges of individual squirrels do overlap, and population densities can range from 1.3 to 2.5 per hectare (0.53 to 1.01/acre). In the winter, several individuals can share the same burrow.
