= Forrest's rock squirrel =

Conservation status
- Least Concern (IUCN 3.1)

Scientific classification
- Kingdom: Animalia
- Phylum: Chordata
- Class: Mammalia
- Order: Rodentia
- Family: Sciuridae
- Genus: Sciurotamias
- Species: S. forresti

Binomial name
- Sciurotamias forresti (Thomas, 1922)

Species of rodent

Forrest's rock squirrel (Sciurotamias forresti) is a species of rodent in the family Sciuridae. It is endemic to Sichuan and Yunnan in China, where it inhabits cliffs covered in shrubby vegetation at an altitude around 3,000 m (9,800 ft). Relatively little is known about Forrest's rock squirrel, but its behavior is assumed to resemble that of its more widespread relative, Père David's rock squirrel. In appearance, it largely resembles Père David's rock squirrel, but Forrest's rock squirrel is more ochraceous in colour and has a faint whitish line on the side.
