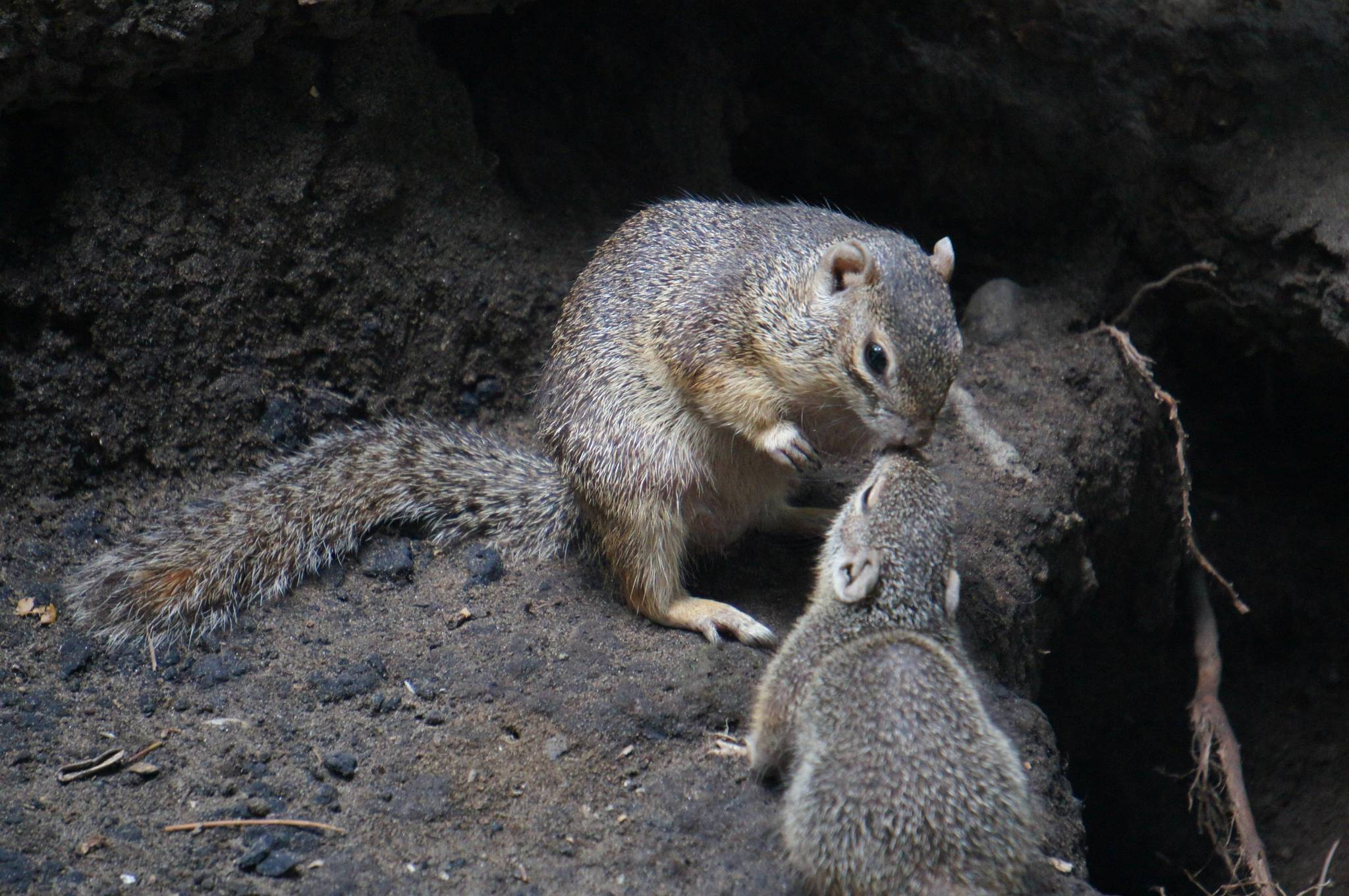

Conservation status
- Least Concern (IUCN 3.1)

Scientific classification
- Kingdom: Animalia
- Phylum: Chordata
- Class: Mammalia
- Order: Rodentia
- Family: Sciuridae
- Genus: Notocitellus
- Species: N. adocetus

Binomial name
- Notocitellus adocetus (Merriam, 1903)

Synonyms
- Spermophilus adocetus

= Tropical ground squirrel =

Species of rodent

The tropical ground squirrel (Notocitellus adocetus) is a species of rodent in the family Sciuridae. At one time the species was originally described as Spermophilus adocetus, but the genus Spermophilus was revised and subdivided in 2009 and it was placed in the genus Notocitellus. It is endemic to arid upland areas and deciduous woodland in Mexico. It is locally referred to as Cuinique.

== Taxonomy ==
This species was first described in 1903 by the American zoologist Clinton Hart Merriam as Spermophilus adocetus. In a revision of the genus Spermophilus in 2009, Helgen determined that it should be split into eight genera, each one of which was morphologically distinct and shown to be a monophyletic clade by phylogenetic analyses. One such genus was Notocitellus, comprising the two species N. adocetus, the tropical ground squirrel, and N. annulatus, the ring-tailed ground squirrel.

== Description ==
The tropical ground squirrel is smaller than its sister species, the ring-tailed ground squirrel (Notocitellus annulatus). The ears are more rounded, the snout is shorter and broader, the colour is paler and the tail is unringed. Many black hairs are mingled with the cinnamon brown fur, the head, upper back and bushy tail being darker than the rest of the pelage. The underparts and inner sides of the limbs are yellowish and there are faint pale streaks above and below the eye. Females have a head-and-body length of 168 mm (6.6 in) with a tail of 132 mm (5.2 in), while males are a little larger.

== Distribution and habitat ==
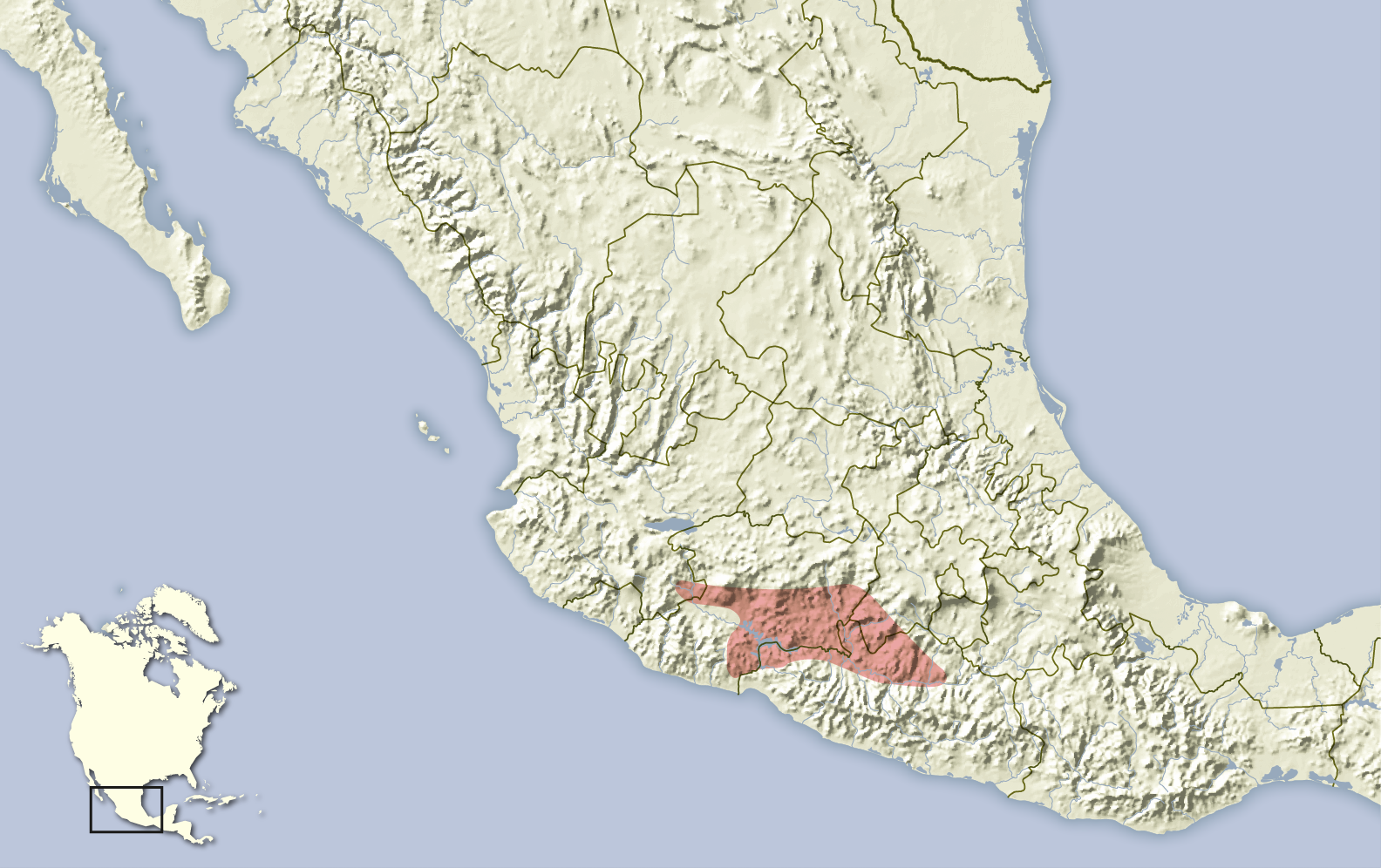
Distribution of the Tropical ground squirrel

The tropical ground squirrel is endemic to Mexico, where its range includes the states of State of Mexico, Guerrero, Jalisco, and Michoacán, most of this range being in the Trans-Mexican volcanic belt at altitudes up to about 3,000 m (10,000 ft). Its typical habitat is arid rocky areas, such as canyons and cliffs, with sparse vegetation, mesquite and barrel cacti, and deciduous woodland. Some of this habitat has been converted to low level agricultural use, and the ground squirrel has adapted to this change in land use by feeding on crops.

== Ecology ==
The tropical ground squirrel is a social, diurnal species that is active throughout most of the year. It digs complex burrows that are up to 60 cm (24 in) deep, under walls or rocks, or at the base of trees. It is omnivorous, but the diet consists mainly of seeds and fruits, especially those of Acacia, Prosopis, Prunus and Crescentia. It also eats green shoots, and on agricultural land will feed on maize, sorghum and beans. Food is mostly gathered in the morning between the hours of 9.00 and 11.00, stuffed into the cheek pouches and carried back to the burrow for later consumption.

If food is scarce in the hottest part of the year, this ground squirrel may aestivate for a short time. It may breed throughout the year in farmland but in deciduous woodland it probably breeds between May and June before the start of the wet season. The population size varies widely from year to year. In remote places, this ground squirrel is shy but when living near humans it becomes habituated to them and is more bold, scampering away when humans come close and watching their activity while perched on a wall, or taking refuge in a crevice and peering out.

Although in the wild, it eats mostly seeds and fruits, in captivity, it can eat corn, meat, lettuce, tortillas, and bread. When feeding, it sits on its haunches and pushes food into its mouth using its front feet.

== Status ==
The tropical ground squirrel is a common species in suitable habitat, with populations varying widely from year to year. It has a wide range and a presumed large total population. The International Union for Conservation of Nature has identified no particular threats to this species and has assessed its conservation status as being of "least concern".
