= Notocitellus =

Scientific classification
- Kingdom: Animalia
- Phylum: Chordata
- Class: Mammalia
- Order: Rodentia
- Family: Sciuridae
- Tribe: Marmotini
- Genus: Notocitellus; A. H. Howell, 1938

Type species
- Spermophilus annulatus Audubon & Bachman, 1842

Species
- N. adocetus N. annulatus
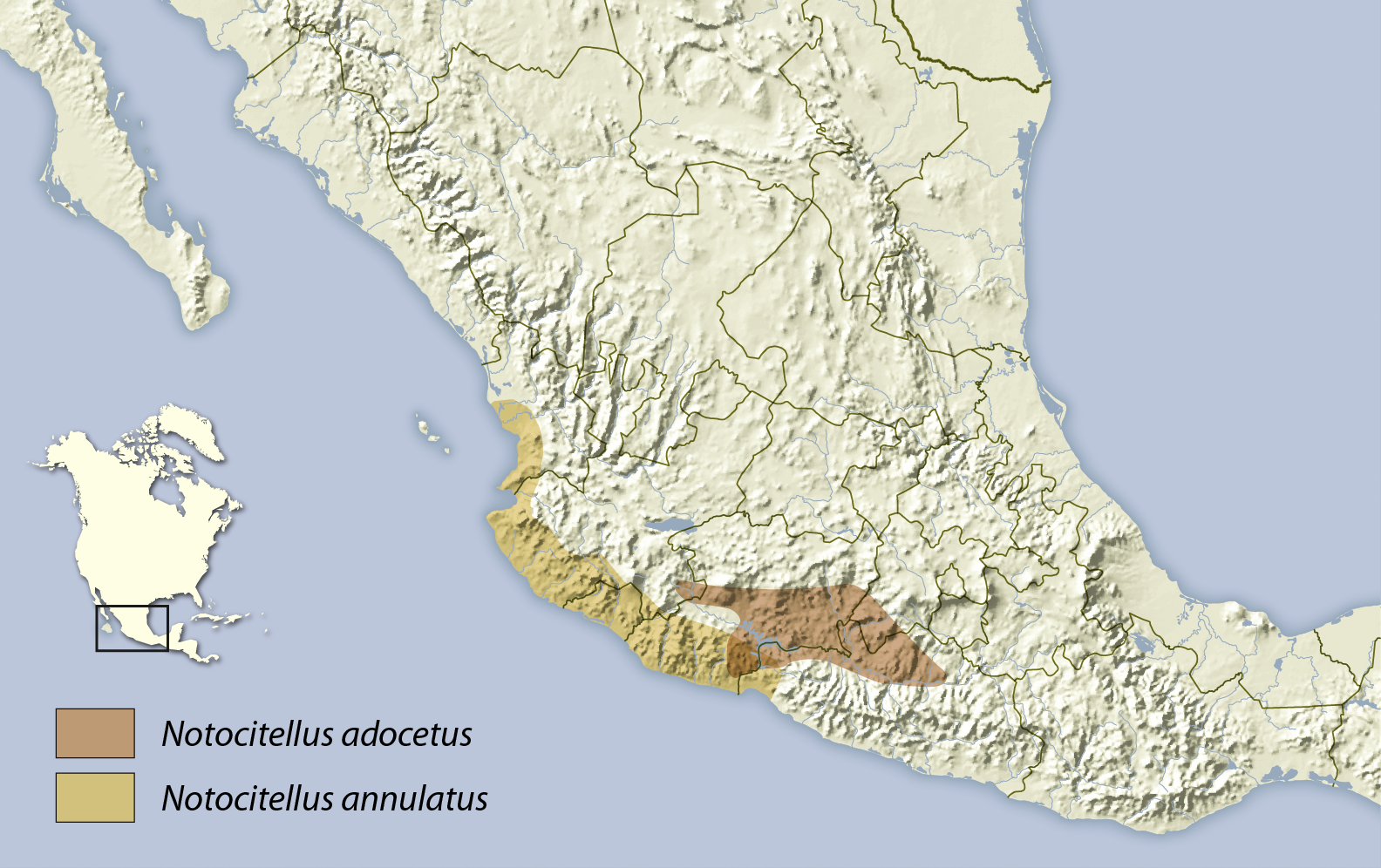
- Distribution of the Notocitellus ground squirrels

Genus of rodents

Notocitellus is a genus of ground squirrels, containing two species from Mexico. These species are the tropical ground squirrel (Notocitellus adocetus), and the ring-tailed ground squirrel (N. annulatus). Notocitellus was formerly placed in the large ground squirrel genus Spermophilus, as a subgenus or species group. Since DNA sequencing of the cytochrome b gene has shown Spermophilus to be paraphyletic to the marmots, antelope squirrels, and prairie dogs, it is now separated, along with six other genera. The exact relations of this genus are unclear, though a relation to the antelope squirrels is possible.
