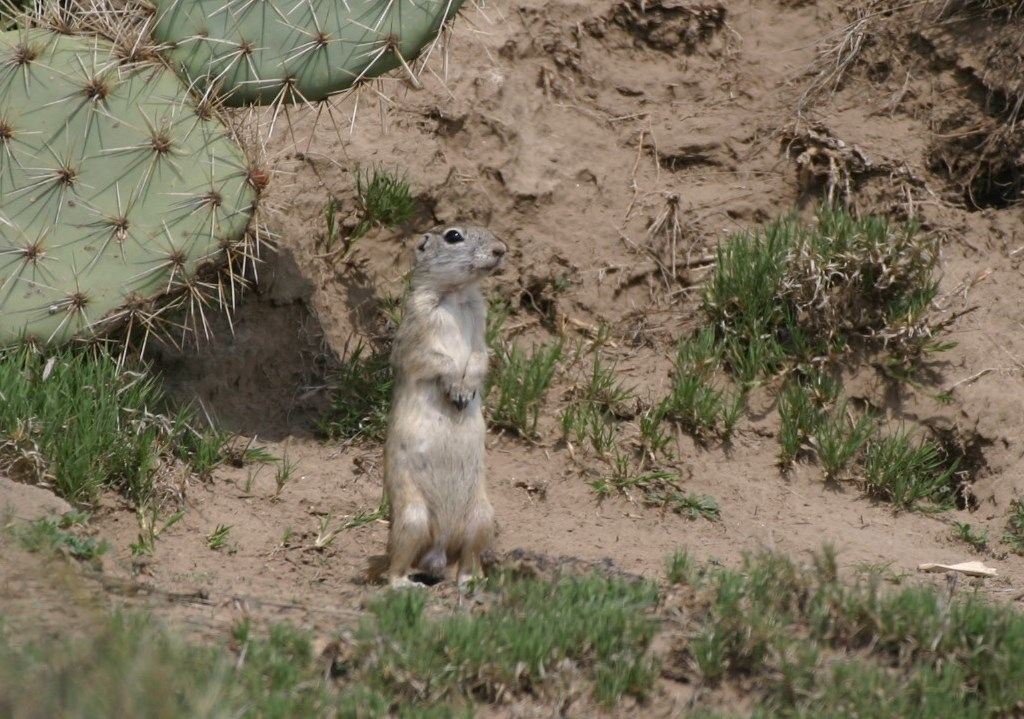

Conservation status
- Endangered (IUCN 3.1)

Scientific classification
- Kingdom: Animalia
- Phylum: Chordata
- Class: Mammalia
- Order: Rodentia
- Family: Sciuridae
- Genus: Xerospermophilus
- Species: X. perotensis

Binomial name
- Xerospermophilus perotensis (Merriam, 1893)

Synonyms
- Spermophilus perotensis Merriam, 1893

= Perote ground squirrel =

Species of rodent

The Perote ground squirrel (Xerospermosphilus perotensis) is a species of rodent in the family Sciuridae. It is endemic to Mexico and is currently at risk of extinction. Perote ground squirrels live within the same area as rock squirrels (Otospermophilus variegatus) but they use different microhabitats. In one case it also shares its habitat with the Mexican ground squirrel (Ictidomys mexicanus).

== Description ==
Perote ground squirrels have traits similar to those of spotted ground squirrels (X. spilosoma pallescens) found in the northern Mexican Plateau; however they are larger, have shorter tails and yellow backs. Its skull is relatively narrow with a large braincase and they have heavy, thick teeth. Perote ground squirrels have two annual cycles, an active phase (March–November) and a hibernation phase (December–February). Some overlap may occur in March and November however.

X. perotensis was first described as a species in 1893. Much research is being done recently, and many scientists think it should be classified as a subspecies of X. spilosoma. "In either case, and regardless of the position one might adopt around species concepts, it is evident that X. perotensis constitutes an independent and isolated biological entity that has evolved under restricted geographical and ecological contexts as a consequence of recent Pleistocene events".

== Phylogeny ==
The Perote ground squirrel's closest relative is believed to be the spotted ground squirrel (X. spilosoma) which split from each other 1.2-3.3 million years ago as a result of climate shifts during the Pleistocene.

== Distribution and habitat ==
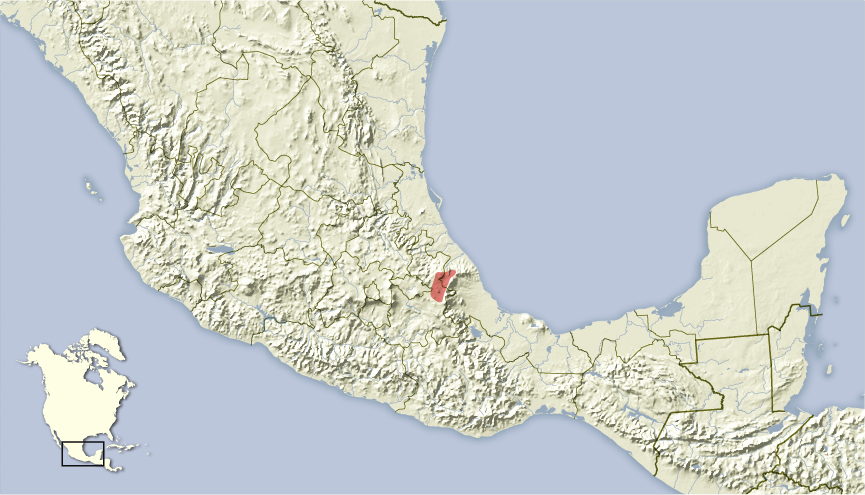
distribution of the Perote ground squirrel in Mexico

The habitat range of the Perote ground squirrel is in the Oriental Basin (5250 km2) between Puebla and Veracruz. The basin is surrounded by high mountains thought to have arisen from volcanic activity. This also accounts for the pockets of arid and semiarid land. The semiarid land in Perote is the most humid in the area with an average rainfall of 369.77 mm between June and September. The average temperature is 11.9 °C with highs of 14.73 °C and lows of 8.80 °C.

Perote ground squirrels only live in alkaline grasslands, arid scrubs and hilly, rocky areas where they will dig their burrows. However, due to agriculture, overgrazing, and the urbanizing of the area, the suitable habitat for the squirrel is down to 16 small localities. These areas are mostly narrow strips (20–50 m) separated by an average distance of 15.8 km.

This species is threatened by extensive habitat fragmentation and deforestation within its restricted range due to timber extraction and clearing of forest for agriculture. While the squirrel once occupied a range of approximately 5250 square kilometers, it now only occupies an area totaling 2457 square kilometers. The Oriental Basin is surrounded almost entirely by a belt of temperate mountain ranges, which prevent the squirrel from dispersing to new habitat. The Oriental Basin is made up of lava flows, isolated mountains, and volcanoes and so provides only localized habitable areas.

== Diet ==
X. perotenses is a generalist species in its diet. It is mostly found in croplands and open areas with low vegetation. In most studies, researchers bait traps with oats in order to catch individuals.

== Life history and reproduction ==
Perote ground squirrels form family groups within individual burrow systems. In some cases males will leave the burrow to locate females in dispersed areas. This causes aggression between adults and yearling males that ultimately leads to further male migration. Adult males become active in March (before sub-adults and females). Copulation occurs between April and May and pregnant and/or lactating females were most common in June–August. The average number of embryos was found to be six, where the average number of live juveniles was four.

Due to the habitat destruction and fragmentation of land, there are fewer opportunities for breeding between genetically diverse individuals. Perote ground squirrels have been seen mating within their own family, which may lead to inbreeding. However, results have shown that "no inbreeding coefficient value for any population was significantly different from zero, implying that inbreeding had little effect on genetic structure."

== Genetic diversity and conservation ==
Due to the increased fragmentation of the ground squirrels native habitat, they have suffered a sharp decrease in genetic diversity. By comparing mitochondrial DNA of current populations with historic museum specimens, scientists have observed a decrease in haplotype and nucleotide diversity. Because of rapid generation times and large effective population sizes, Sciurids are expected to exhibit high numbers of haplotypes; however, the Perote Ground Squirrel is an exception to the rule. Scientists are concerned that this loss of genetic diversity may contribute to their eventual extinction. It is recommended that management action be taken to help increase genetic diversity; the most likely solution being a relocation of certain individuals within each of the 16 populations.

== Threats ==
Species can respond to environmental change in one of three possible ways: (a) migrating; that is, tracking their ecological niche throughout the geographic space. The Perote ground squirrel has such particular environmental needs that they do not have a place to migrate. (b) adapting in terms of evolutionary change and/or physiological acclimation; and (c) becoming locally extinct."

Some studies have found that because the Perote ground squirrel is a seasonal species, it is more affected by climate change, increasing the risk of extinction. Seasonal species are more vulnerable because they are forced to do all their annual activities in a shorter amount of time. They do not migrate and have to adjust their activities, such as hibernation, with the current climate.

The squirrel also has predators such as the long-tailed weasel (Mustela frenata) and domestic dogs, which have impacts on population.

== Future ==
"Ground-dwelling small mammals are key species, considered as ecosystem engineers because of their positive effects on soil condition, by introducing organic matter, favoring water infiltration and modifying its physical structure, thus enriching vegetation composition and favoring phreatic aquifer maintenance. Their burrows often provide microhabitats for other vertebrate and invertebrate species. In addition, ground squirrels are important prey for several predator species, some of which highly depend on them during their breeding season." If the ground squirrel were to go extinct, there would be a dramatic change in the ecosystem.
