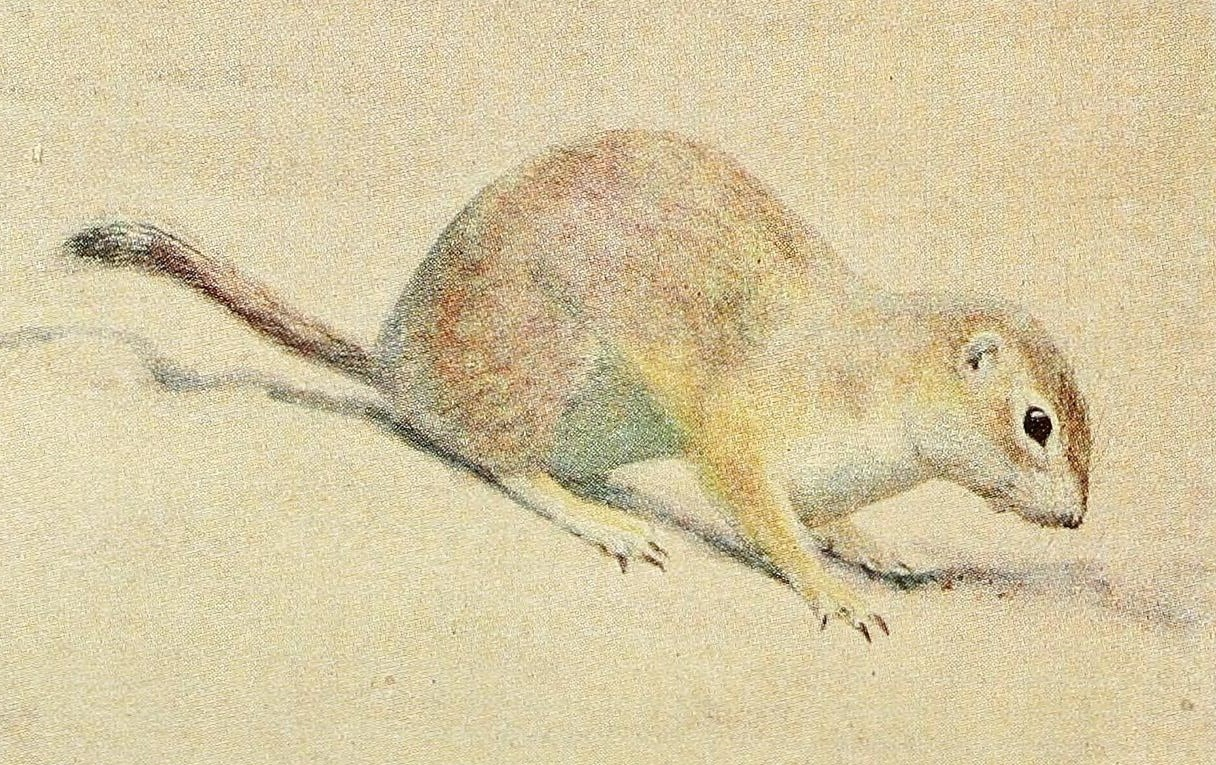

Conservation status
- Near Threatened (IUCN 3.1)

Scientific classification
- Kingdom: Animalia
- Phylum: Chordata
- Class: Mammalia
- Infraclass: Placentalia
- Order: Rodentia
- Family: Sciuridae
- Genus: Xerospermophilus
- Species: X. mohavensis

Binomial name
- Xerospermophilus mohavensis (Merriam, 1889)
- Xerospermophilus mohavensis range map (2021), from the California Department of Fish and Wildlife

Synonyms
- Spermophilus mohavensis Merriam, 1889

= Mohave ground squirrel =

Species of rodent

The Mohave ground squirrel (Xerospermophilus mohavensis) is a species of ground squirrel found only in the Mojave Desert in California. The squirrel was first described in 1886 by Frank Stephens of San Diego. It is listed as a threatened species under the California Endangered Species Act, but not under the federal Endangered Species Act. The IUCN lists this species as near threatened.

== Description ==
The Mohave ground squirrel measures about nine inches from nose to tail and feeds on leaves and seeds from February to July. Near the end of July, the squirrels begin a period of estivation, but this may occur as early as April in drought years. Populations generally do not reproduce following winters with less than 80mm of precipitation. Local populations can be wiped out if a drought lasts for multiple years.

== Habitat and diet ==
This squirrel inhabits the western Mojave Desert in portions of Inyo, Kern, Los Angeles, and San Bernardino counties. It can occupy Joshua tree woodlands, creosote scrub, saltbush scrub and mojave mixed woody scrub. Typical forage plants are those that meet nutritional and water content requirements. These can include shrubs such as winterfat, spiny hopsage, and boxthorn (Lycium spp.). Preferred annuals include Coreopsis spp., Eremalche spp., Astragalus spp., and lupine.

Soils are usually friable and conducive to burrow excavation. Areas of preferred habitat include habitat types that provide ample forage to allow Mohave ground squirrels to persist during drought periods. These persistent populations may act as core areas from which populations expand from during adequate rainfall years which are required for Mohave ground squirrels to reproduce. This dynamic expansion and contraction in populations can make it challenging to determine whether the species is present since extended periods of drought can cause a die-off on local populations until surrounding populations expand during consecutive reproductive years.

== Behavior ==
Mohave ground squirrels emit a high-pitched "peep" as an alarm call, when startled or when young begin to emerge from their natal burrows. The vocalization is sometimes confused with that of the horned lark, and, in areas where the two species are sympatric, with round-tailed ground squirrels. Mohave ground squirrels can occasionally be sighted perched in Lycium cooperii or in Creosote bush (Larrea tridentata) during mid-morning (9-11 a.m.) hours (April–June) basking in the sun.

Males emerge from hibernation in early February and females are soon to follow. Reproduction occurs in early March and gestation lasts for about four weeks. Litters range from 4-6 individuals. Juveniles emerge from the natal burrows in late May to Mid June. Predators include badgers, coyotes, snakes, falcons and hawks.
