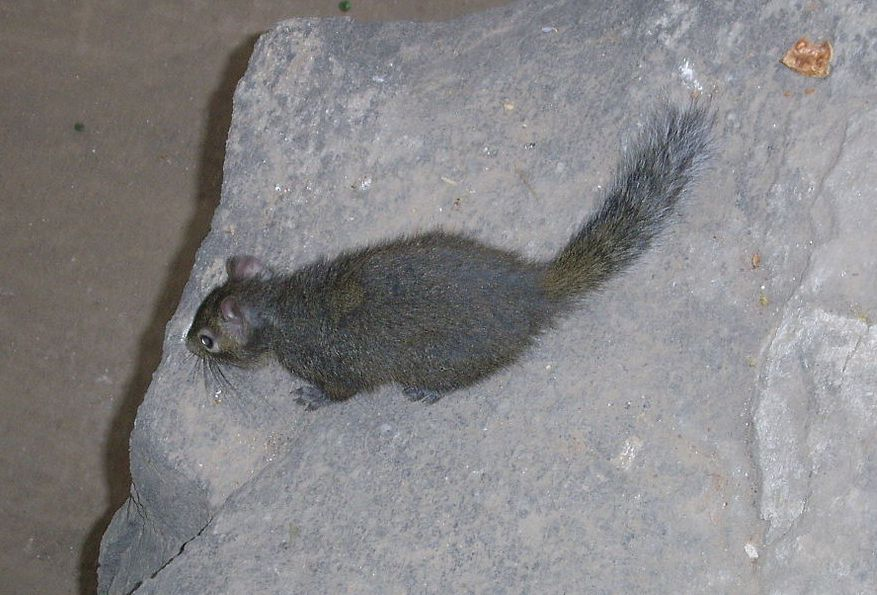
- Père David's rock squirrel (Sciurotamias davidianus)

Scientific classification
- Domain: Eukaryota
- Kingdom: Animalia
- Phylum: Chordata
- Class: Mammalia
- Order: Rodentia
- Family: Sciuridae
- Tribe: Marmotini
- Genus: Sciurotamias; Miller, 1901

Type species
- Sciurus davidianus A. Milne-Edwards, 1867

= Sciurotamias =

Genus of rodents

Sciurotamias is a genus of rodent in the family Sciuridae, found in China. It contains the following species:

- Père David's rock squirrel (Sciurotamias davidianus)
- Forrest's rock squirrel (Sciurotamias forresti)
