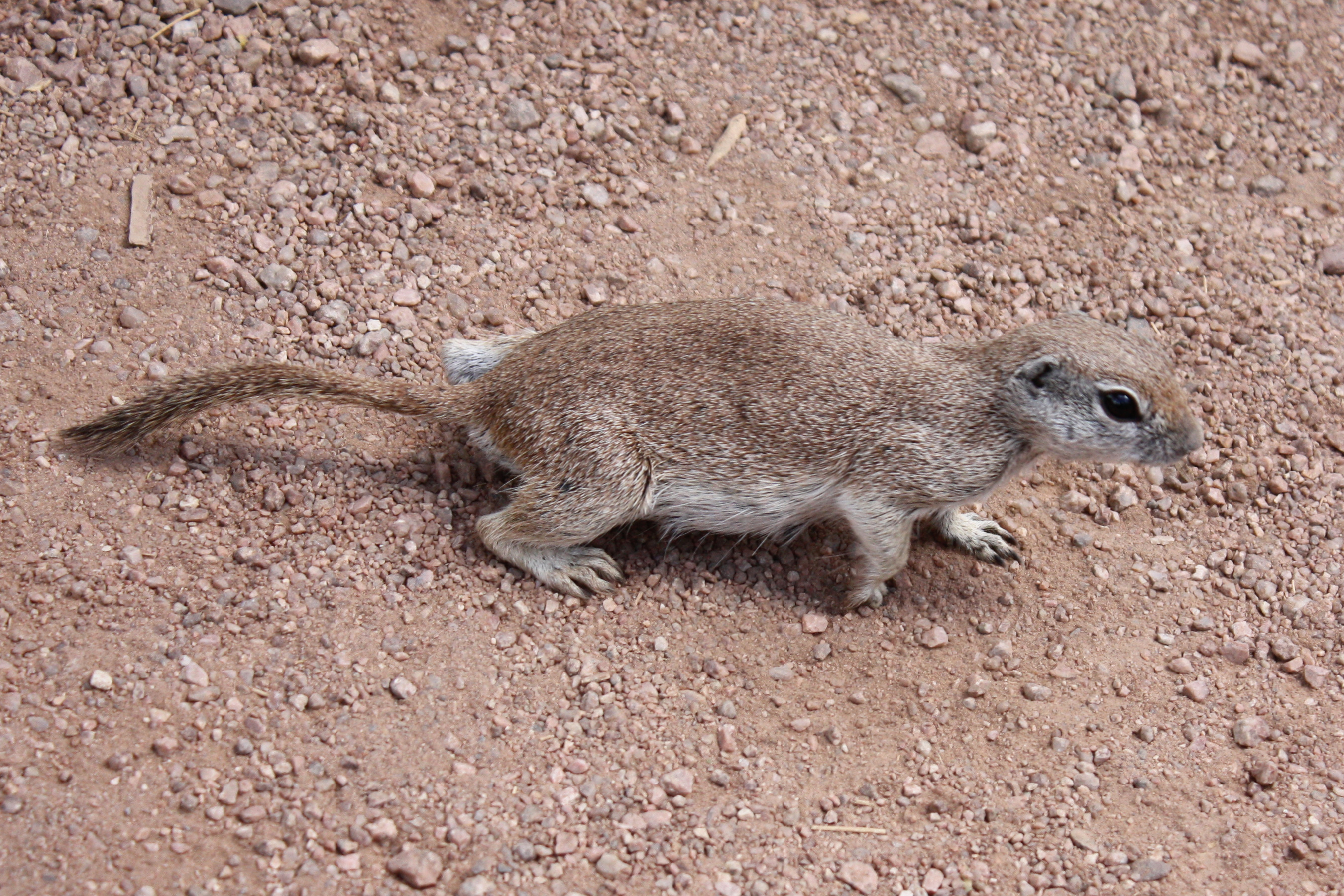

Conservation status
- Least Concern (IUCN 3.1)

Scientific classification
- Kingdom: Animalia
- Phylum: Chordata
- Class: Mammalia
- Order: Rodentia
- Family: Sciuridae
- Genus: Xerospermophilus
- Species: X. tereticaudus

Binomial name
- Xerospermophilus tereticaudus (Baird, 1858)

Subspecies
- X. t. chlorus X. t. tereticaudus

Synonyms
- Spermophilus tereticaudus Baird, 1858

= Round-tailed ground squirrel =

Species of rodent

The round-tailed ground squirrel (Xerospermophilus tereticaudus), known as "Ardillón cola redonda" in Spanish, live in the desert of the Southwestern United States and Northwestern Mexico. They are called "ground squirrels" because they burrow in loose soil, often under mesquite trees and creosote bushes.

== Characteristics ==
Most round-tailed ground squirrels are very small. Weight at birth is approximately 3.9 grams (0.14 oz). Adults weigh around 125 grams (4.4 oz). All have a long round tail and long, hairy hind feet. They have no fur markings, instead having a uniform sandy color, which matches the soil they burrow in. The underside of their body is usually a lighter shade. Round tailed squirrels average 204 to 278 millimetres (8.0 to 10.9 in) in length including the tail which is from 60 to 112 millimetres (2.4 to 4.4 in) long.

At Desert Botanical Garden, Phoenix

== Life cycle ==
The gestation period is 28 days. An average of 5.4 pups are born in each litter. They reach sexual maturity at 325 days. There is little information on the longevity of these animals but one wild born specimen lived to approximately 8.9 years in captivity. They are prey animals for coyotes, badgers, hawks and snakes. Round-tailed ground-squirrels have also been found with the Coccidian parasite Eimeria vilasi, normally found in other rodents and Old World marmotine rodents.

== Behavior ==
Ground squirrels are well-adapted to desert life, as they mainly reside in the desert regions of the southwestern United States, northeastern Baja California, and northwestern Mexico, specifically in the state of Sonora. They can stay active even on the hottest of days, although they do tend to limit their activity during the heat of the afternoon sun. They live underground in the winter, typically from late August or September until January or February. They go into torpor, but do not hibernate. Males are active first in late January as they start mating in March. Ground squirrels' activity cycle makes them not aggressive or competitive. Their main activities include caring for newborn, finding better protection for their resources, and reducing predation. They chase each other and nuzzle each other.

The greatest predator of the ground squirrel is a snake—the type of snake varying by the locality. As a result, ground squirrels have evolved to perform anti-snake displays to defend themselves. These squirrels tend to be put on a prominent display, specifically by moving their tail back-and-forth horizontally. They also approach the predator and sometimes kick some dirt at the snake.

== Social structure ==
They have a semi-colonial social structure, and will alert others of impending danger with a high-pitched alarm call. But they will chase away other ground squirrels who get too close to their own burrow. The males are dominant during the breeding season (January through March). The females dominate during the raising of the young (March and April). However, recent studies suggest that they may have a matrilineal population structure with more socialization than anticipated. This means that round-tailed ground squirrels may have a greater tendency to socialize within familial groups of female squirrels.

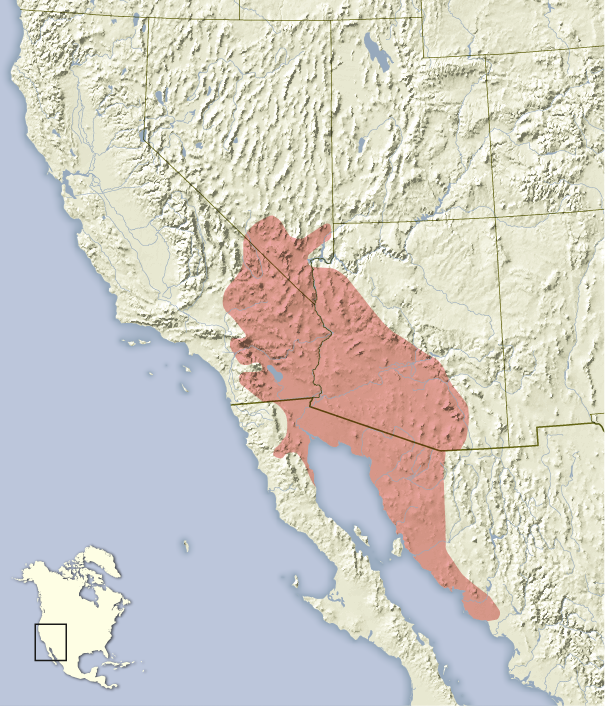
Distribution of the Round-tailed ground squirrel

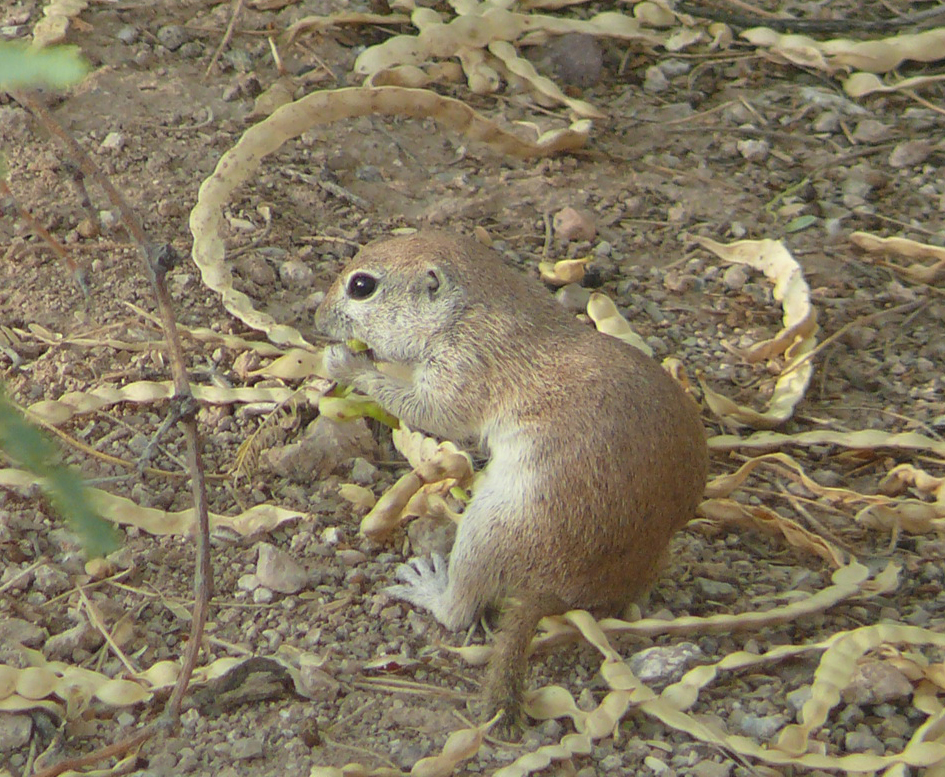
A ground squirrel munches a velvet mesquite pod

== Diet ==
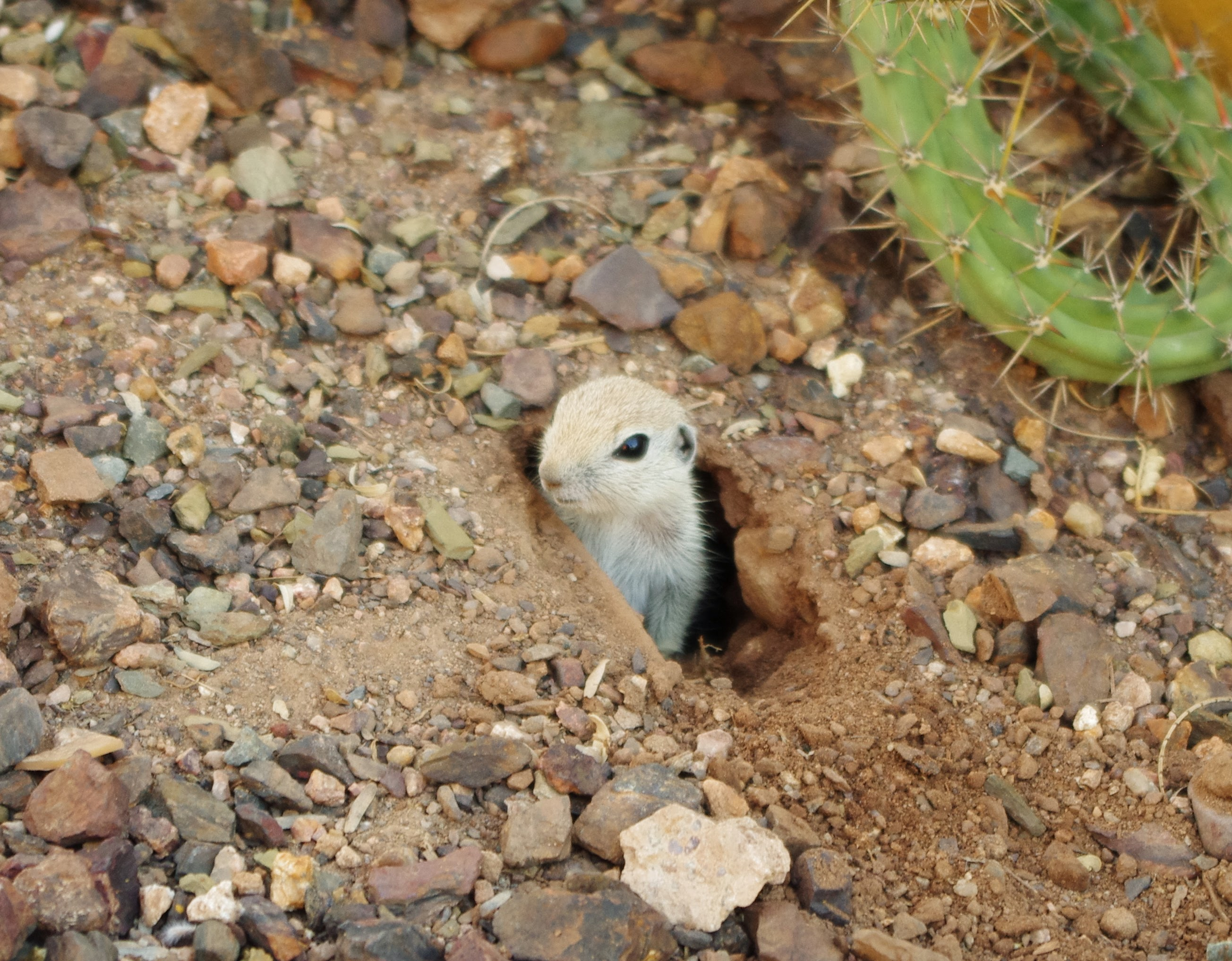
Round-tailed ground squirrel peeking out from burrow

They are omnivores. The bulk of their diet is green vegetation, especially in the summer. They also eat seeds and insects (ants, termites, and grasshoppers). Most of their foods are chosen for high water content because of the shortage of available water in their environment. The average water content of the food they eat is 80%.

The squirrels prefer seeds and parts of grasses and flowers, but can climb into shrubs and trees for food.
