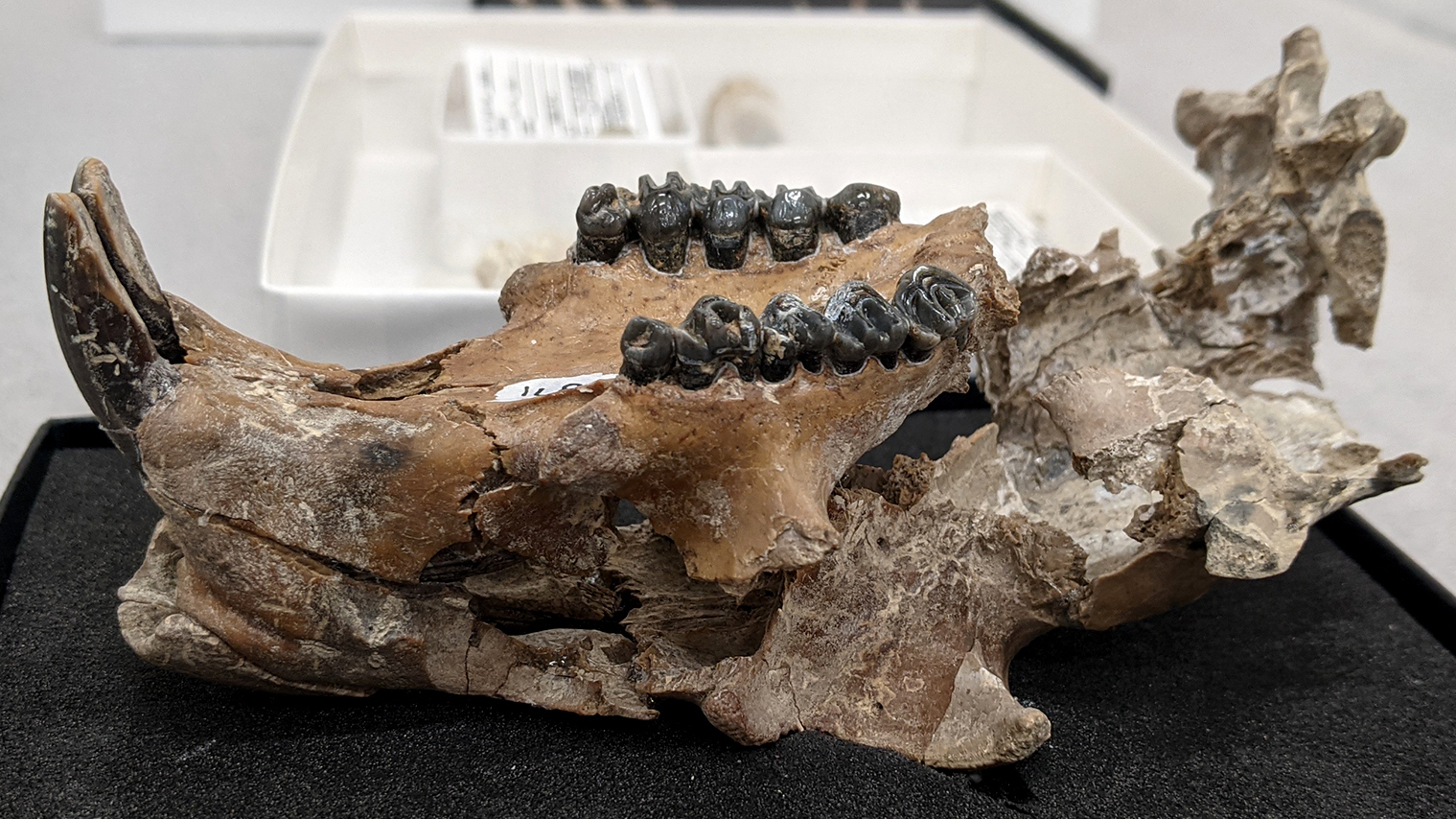

Scientific classification
- Kingdom: Animalia
- Phylum: Chordata
- Class: Mammalia
- Infraclass: Placentalia
- Order: Rodentia
- Family: Sciuridae
- Tribe: Marmotini
- Genus: †Paenemarmota; Hibbert & Schultz 1948

Species
- P. barbouri; P. mexicana; P. sawrockensis

= Paenemarmota =

Paenemarmota Temporal range: Miocene to Early Pleistocene, 10.3–1.8 Ma

Extinct genus of ground squirrel

Paenemarmota is an extinct genus of ground squirrel from North America. Fossils are known from the Blancan and Hemphillian age from localities in the United States (Nebraska, Kansas, Texas, Arizona) and Mexico. At around the size of a beaver, Paenemarmota is the largest known member of the squirrel family.

== Description ==
Paenemarmota is the largest known ground squirrel and is nearly twice as large as the largest living marmots. Weight estimates for P. barbouri are around 9.5 kg (21 lb) on the basis of femur dimensions, or up to 16 kg (35 lb) on the basis of lengths of premolars. On the basis of lengths of premolars, P. mexicana may have weighed up to 15.7 kg (35 lb), while P. sawrockensis was smaller, at up to 12.4 kg (27 lb).

Although some of its features are primitive, in general morphology it resembles the ground squirrels of the genus Spermophilus sensu lato, such as Urocitellus undulatus. The large upper and lower fourth premolars are proportionally very large, a feature shared with modern marmots. The large fourth premolars are exceptions to the general evolutionary trend in the ground squirrels and only in Paenemarmota and the living Marmota are these teeth larger than the first molars.
