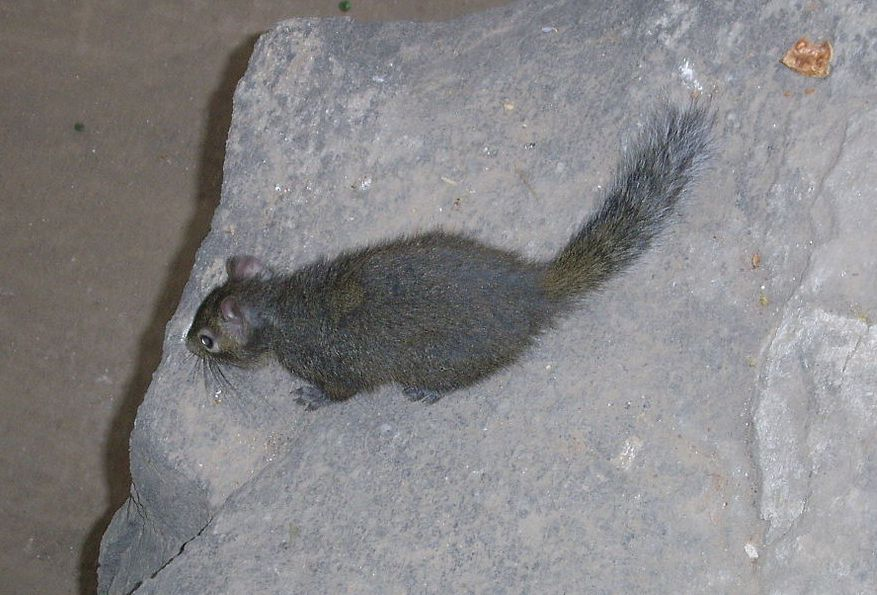

Conservation status
- Least Concern (IUCN 3.1)

Scientific classification
- Kingdom: Animalia
- Phylum: Chordata
- Class: Mammalia
- Order: Rodentia
- Family: Sciuridae
- Genus: Sciurotamias
- Species: S. davidianus

Binomial name
- Sciurotamias davidianus (A. Milne-Edwards, 1867)
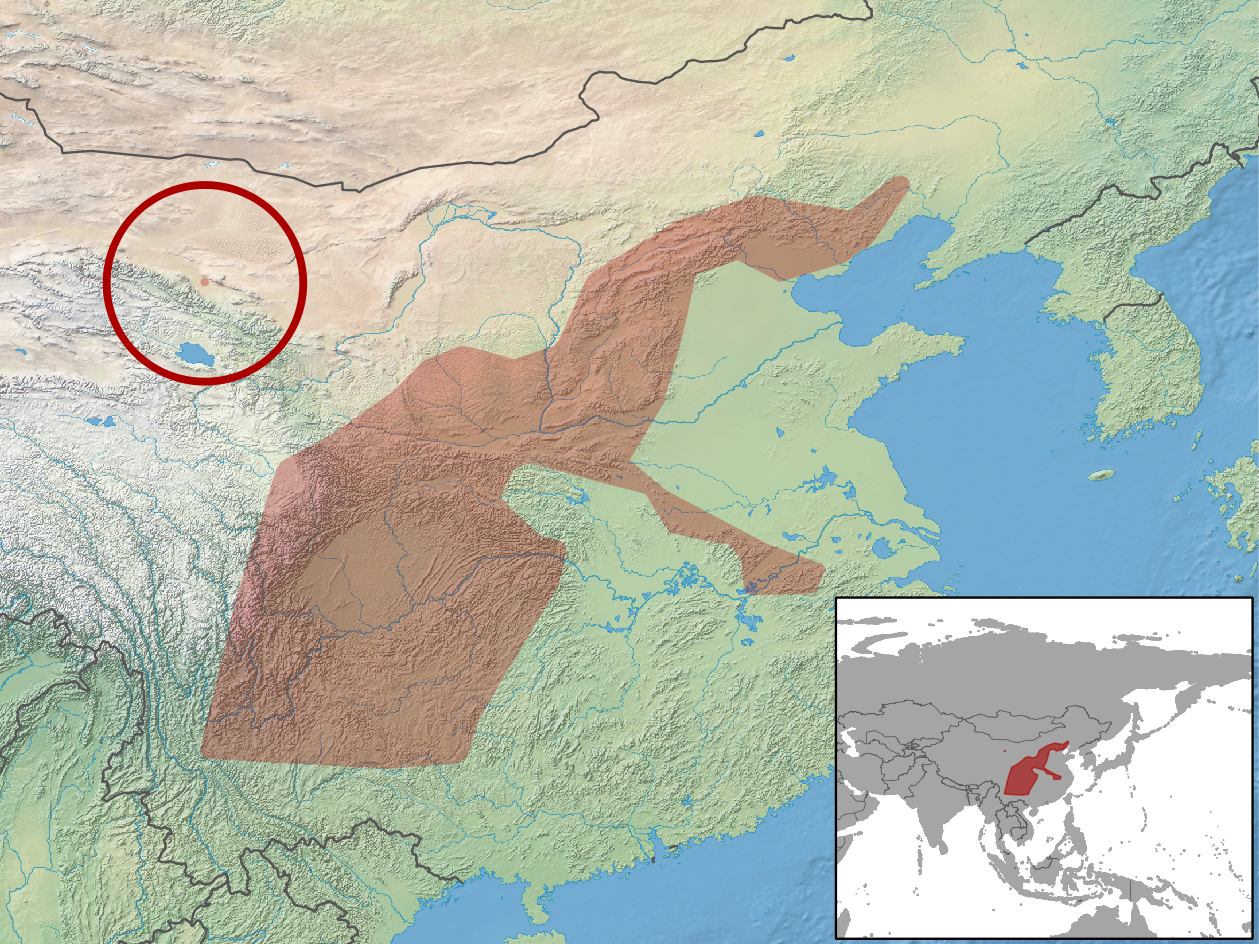

= Père David's rock squirrel =

Species of rodent

The Père David's rock squirrel (Sciurotamias davidianus), also known as the Chinese rock squirrel, is a species of rodent in the family Sciuridae. It is endemic to China, where it is found widely in rocky habitats in the eastern and central parts of the country. This largely terrestrial squirrel is overall dull olive-grey with paler underparts, a distinct pale eye-ring and a dark patch on the cheeks. It has sometimes been confused with the rather different –but in colour very variable– Pallas's squirrel; an introduced population in Belgium was first mistakenly identified as Père David's rock squirrel.
