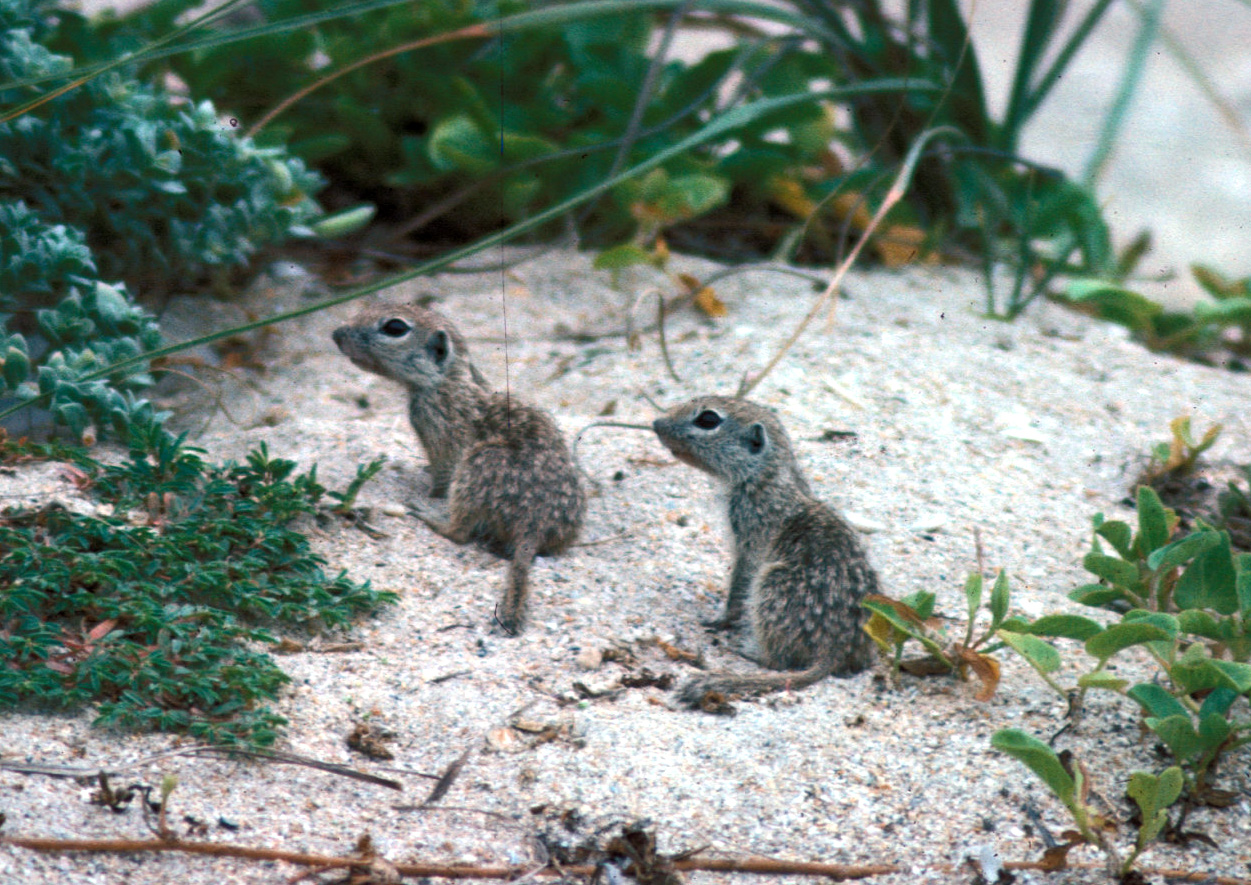

Conservation status
- Least Concern (IUCN 3.1)

Scientific classification
- Kingdom: Animalia
- Phylum: Chordata
- Class: Mammalia
- Order: Rodentia
- Family: Sciuridae
- Genus: Xerospermophilus
- Species: X. spilosoma

Binomial name
- Xerospermophilus spilosoma (Bennett, 1833)

Synonyms
- Spermophilus spilosoma Bennet, 1833

= Spotted ground squirrel =

Species of squirrel

The spotted ground squirrel (Xerospermophilus spilosoma) is a species of ground squirrel in the rodent family Sciuridae. It is found throughout Mexico and the central and western United States. Characterized by a white spotted back, the spotted ground squirrel is one of the smallest squirrels found in North America. They are mainly herbivorous, but also eat insects. A burrowing mammal, the spotted ground squirrel will make tunnels to store its food, as well as shelter and hibernation quarters.

== Description ==
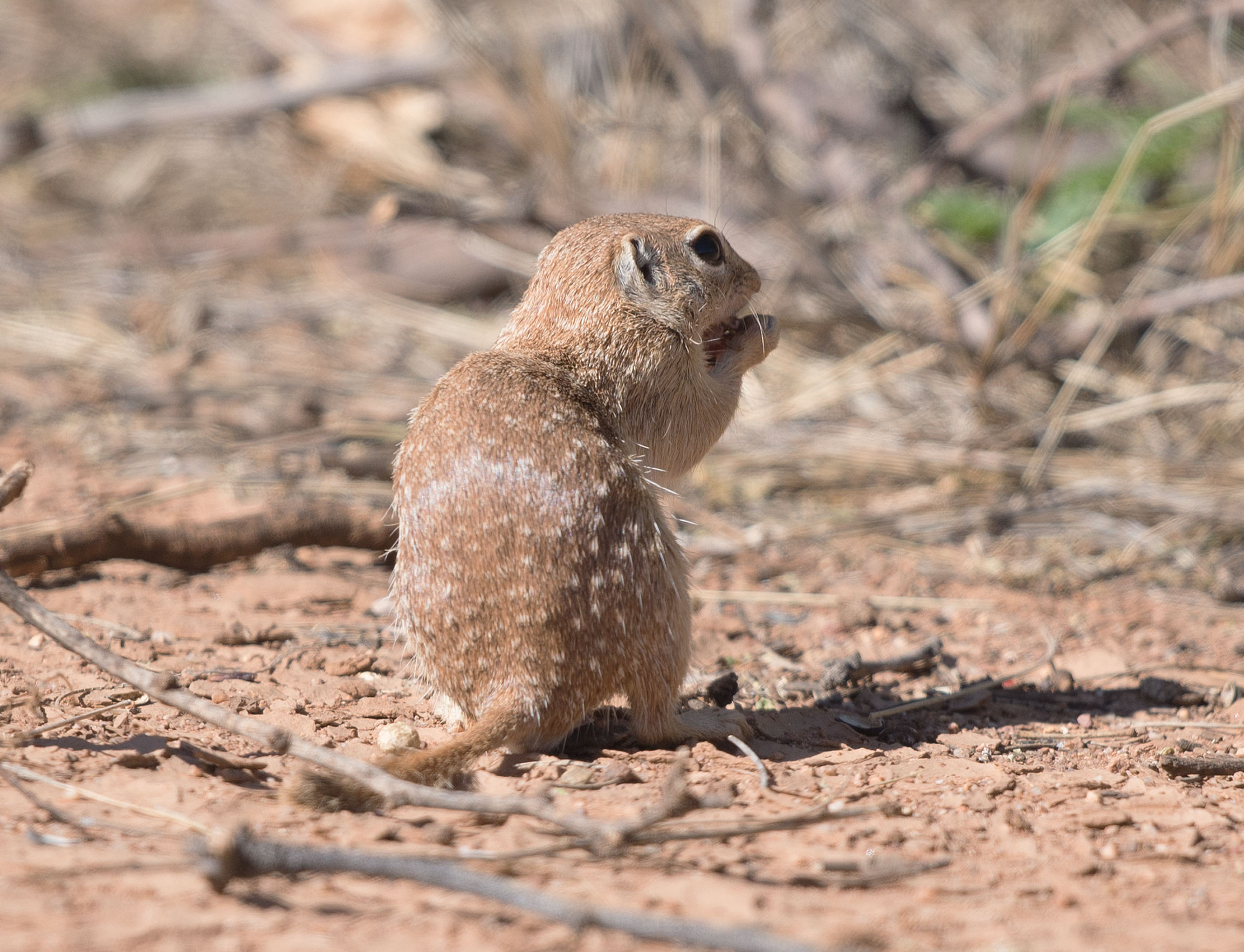
Spotted ground squirrel eating, displaying spotted back

The spotted ground squirrel is one of the smallest squirrels to inhabit the northern hemisphere. It has many white linear dorsal spots, as well as a white underbelly. Coloration of the rest of its body varies greatly and can be different shades of brown, black, gray and white. Its skull resembles that of the thirteen-lined ground squirrel, but is slightly broader in the interorbital and rostral regions. A unique characteristic of the skull is the presence of especially large auditory bullae. X. spilosoma has two pelages and molts each year. Adults emerging from hibernation usually display thicker pelages, which are shed by the springtime. Juveniles tend to have darker pelages than their adult counterparts. Fur color can be influenced by environmental surrounds, and it has been found that populations in soil rich areas tend to have darker colorings than grassland living populations.

== Distribution and habitat ==
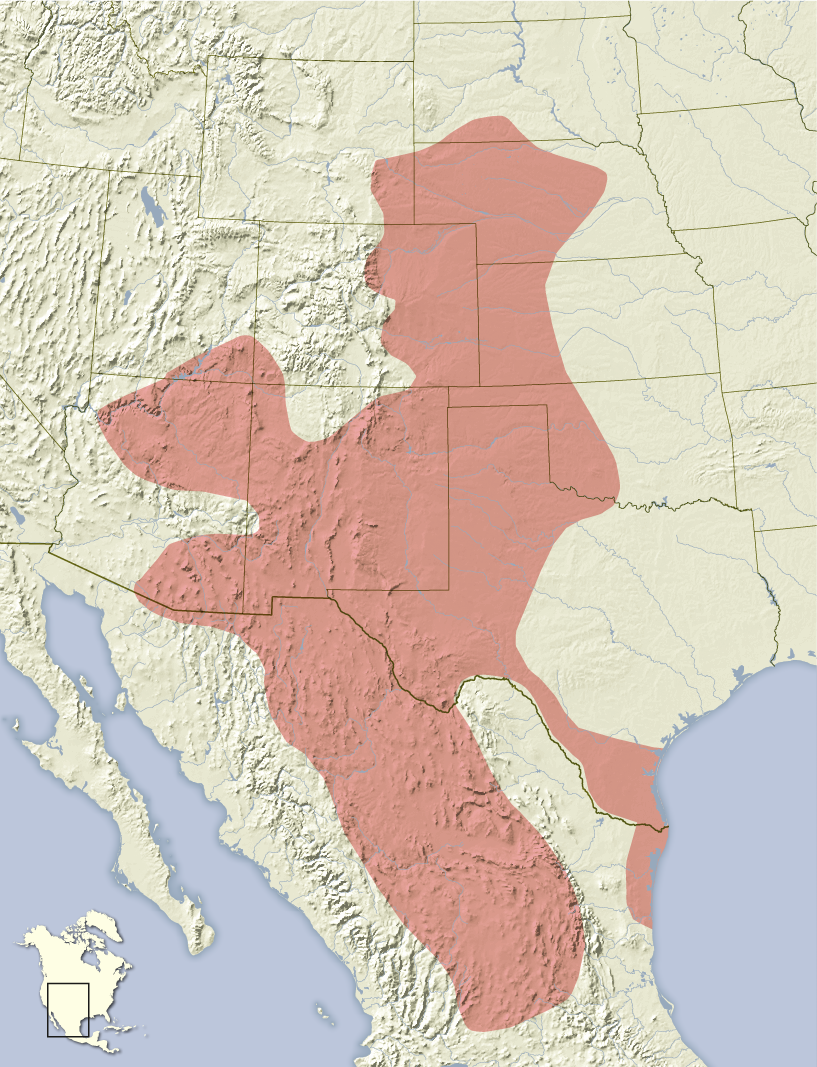
Distribution of the Spotted ground squirrel

The spotted ground squirrel can range from south central South Dakota, through Nebraska where it inhabits sand hills present there. It's also found in eastern Colorado, northwestern Oklahoma, western Texas, eastern Arizona, western Kansas, the large majority of New Mexico and the southeastern part of Utah. Mexico species distribution is limited to south and central Mexico. It is generally found within areas of deep sand soils where vegetation is sparse and scattered, aligning with the environments of the distributive areas it is found in. Being a burrowing animal, the spotted ground squirrel will inhabit sand hills and dunes where it makes it home and has even been found to dwell within abandoned prairie dog burrows. Spotted ground squirrel burrows are usually found on short grass mesa's or along the banks of rivers. They prefer lighter, more sparse soil to create their burrows with and this is why they dwell in arid, dry landscapes that contain this type of soil.

== Diet ==
The spotted ground squirrel is a herbivore and feeds on seeds and green plant parts. It is generally not to be considered a carnivore. Green grass shoots are consumed in the spring and eventually the flowers and seeds of green plants that arise in the summer. The spotted ground squirrel can also display Insectivore like habits within its diet in the late summer by feeding on mainly Grasshopper larvae.

== Behavior ==
Though the spotted ground squirrel is considered to be generally a burrowing mammal which spends a large portion of its time in hibernation, it spends a majority of its above-ground activity foraging and feeding on food resources. With the rest of its time being dedicated to alert calls, maintenance behavior (resting, sun bathing, grooming) and sexual behavior in males and females. During their mating season sexual behavior plays a larger role in its above ground activity, involving a 'frenzy' like pattern of males entering and exiting their burrows sporadically, most likely observed as a type of courting behavior. The spotted ground squirrel have 7 different alert postures used to warn others about likely predators in the area or to stake a territory claim against other males during mating seasons. Hibernation behavior has been observed to begin in late July and go all the way through to April and May. Seasonal activity cycles occurs during the months of April/May through July/August and is estimated to be 115–135 days for males and 95–125 days for females.
