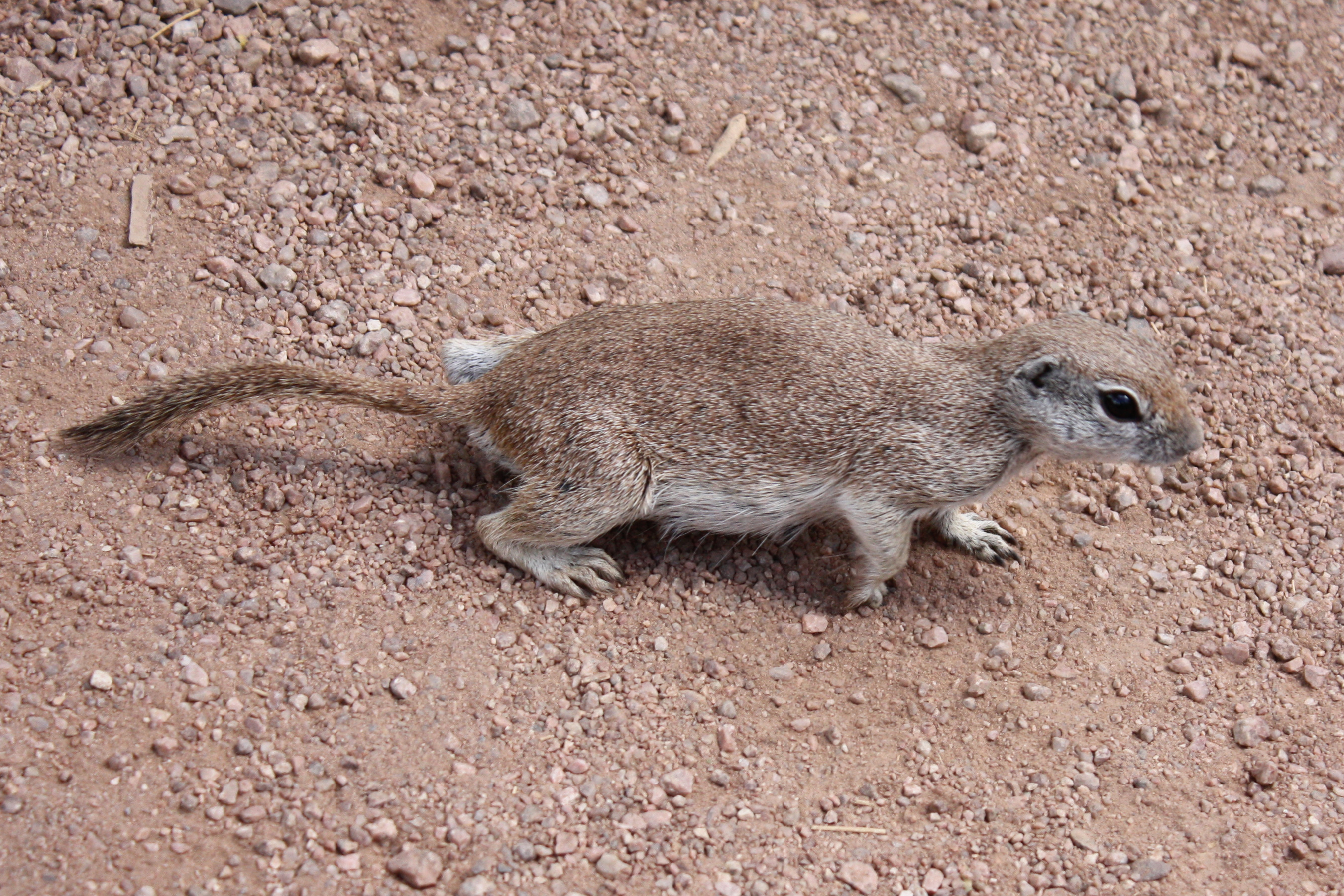
- Round-tailed ground squirrel in Phoenix, Arizona

Scientific classification
- Domain: Eukaryota
- Kingdom: Animalia
- Phylum: Chordata
- Class: Mammalia
- Order: Rodentia
- Family: Sciuridae
- Tribe: Marmotini
- Genus: Xerospermophilus; Merriam, 1892

Type species
- Spermophilus mohavensis Merriam, 1889

Species
- X. mohavensis X. tereticaudus X. spilosoma X. perotensis

= Xerospermophilus =

Genus of rodents

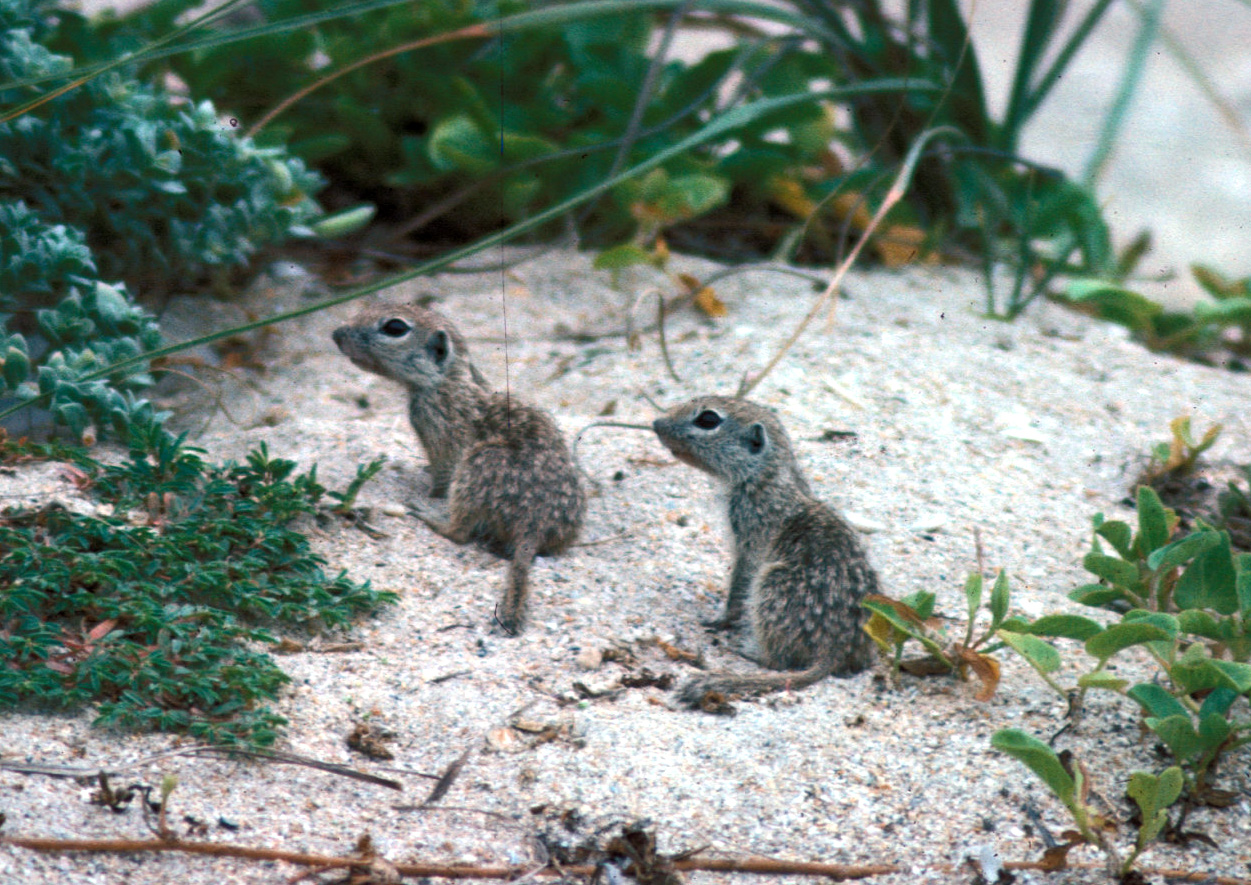
Spotted ground squirrels

Pygmy ground squirrels are small ground squirrels in the genus Xerospermophilus, family Sciuridae, containing four species from Mexico and the United States. The members of this genus were formerly placed in the large ground squirrel genus Spermophilus. Since DNA sequencing of the cytochrome b gene showed that Spermophilus (as then defined) was paraphyletic to the prairie dogs and marmots, this group is now separated, along with six other genera. Within the genus, the Mohave ground squirrel and the round-tailed ground squirrel were thought to be close relatives, sometimes a subgenus Xerospermophilus, while the spotted ground squirrel and the Perote ground squirrel were formerly placed in the subgenus (now a genus) Ictidomys.

The name of the genus is a combination of the Greek word xeros, "dry", and Spermophilus, which also comes from Greek, meaning "seed lovers".

== Species ==
The four species in Xerospermophilus are listed below. These were previously grouped in the subgenus Otospermophilus together with the rock squirrel and other related species.

- Mohave ground squirrel, Xerospermophilus mohavensis
- Perote ground squirrel, Xerospermophilus perotensis
- Spotted ground squirrel, Xerospermophilus spilosoma
- Round-tailed ground squirrel, Xerospermophilus tereticaudus
