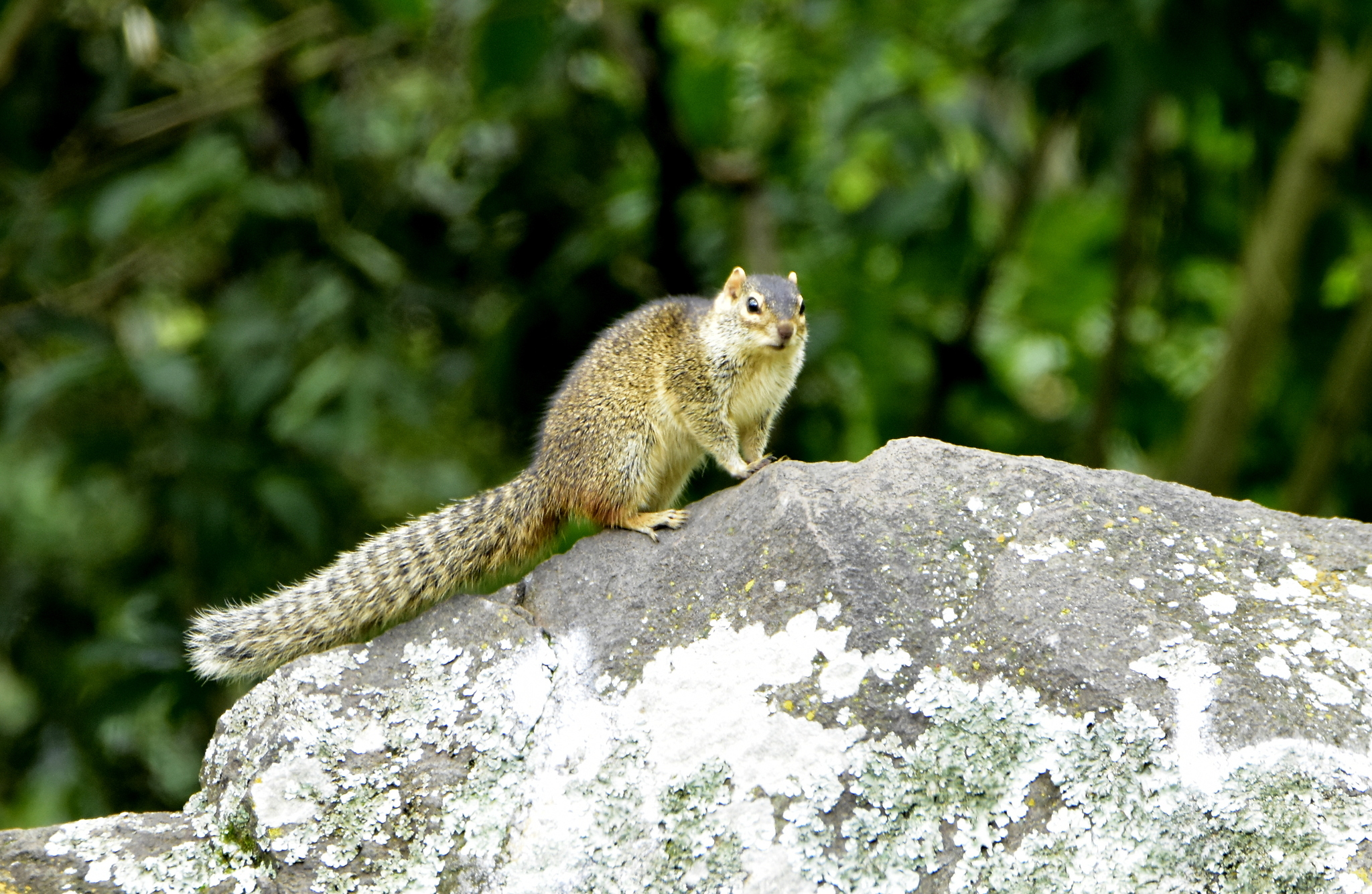
- Notocitellus annulatus

Conservation status
- Least Concern (IUCN 3.1)

Scientific classification
- Kingdom: Animalia
- Phylum: Chordata
- Class: Mammalia
- Order: Rodentia
- Family: Sciuridae
- Genus: Notocitellus
- Species: N. annulatus

Binomial name
- Notocitellus annulatus (Audubon & Bachman, 1842)

Synonyms
- Spermophilus annulatus Audubon & Bachman, 1842

= Ring-tailed ground squirrel =

Species of rodent

The ring-tailed ground squirrel (Notocitellus annulatus) is a species of rodent in the family Sciuridae. It is endemic to the Pacific coast region of central Mexico. It is a common species and feeds mainly on fruits and nuts. The IUCN has assessed it as being of "least concern".

== Description ==
The ring-tailed ground squirrel is between 383 and 470 mm (15 and 19 in) long, half of this being the tail. Compared to the California ground squirrel (Otospermophilus beecheyi) it is slightly smaller, has more slender legs and broader, less-pointed ears. The incisors are orange and the large cheek pouches open inside the mouth. The crown of the head and upper parts of the body have mixed blackish-brown and buff hairs. The chin, throat and underparts are buff. The tail is slender and not bushy, the colour being mixed buff and black above and brownish beneath, with about fifteen dark rings.

== Distribution and habitat ==
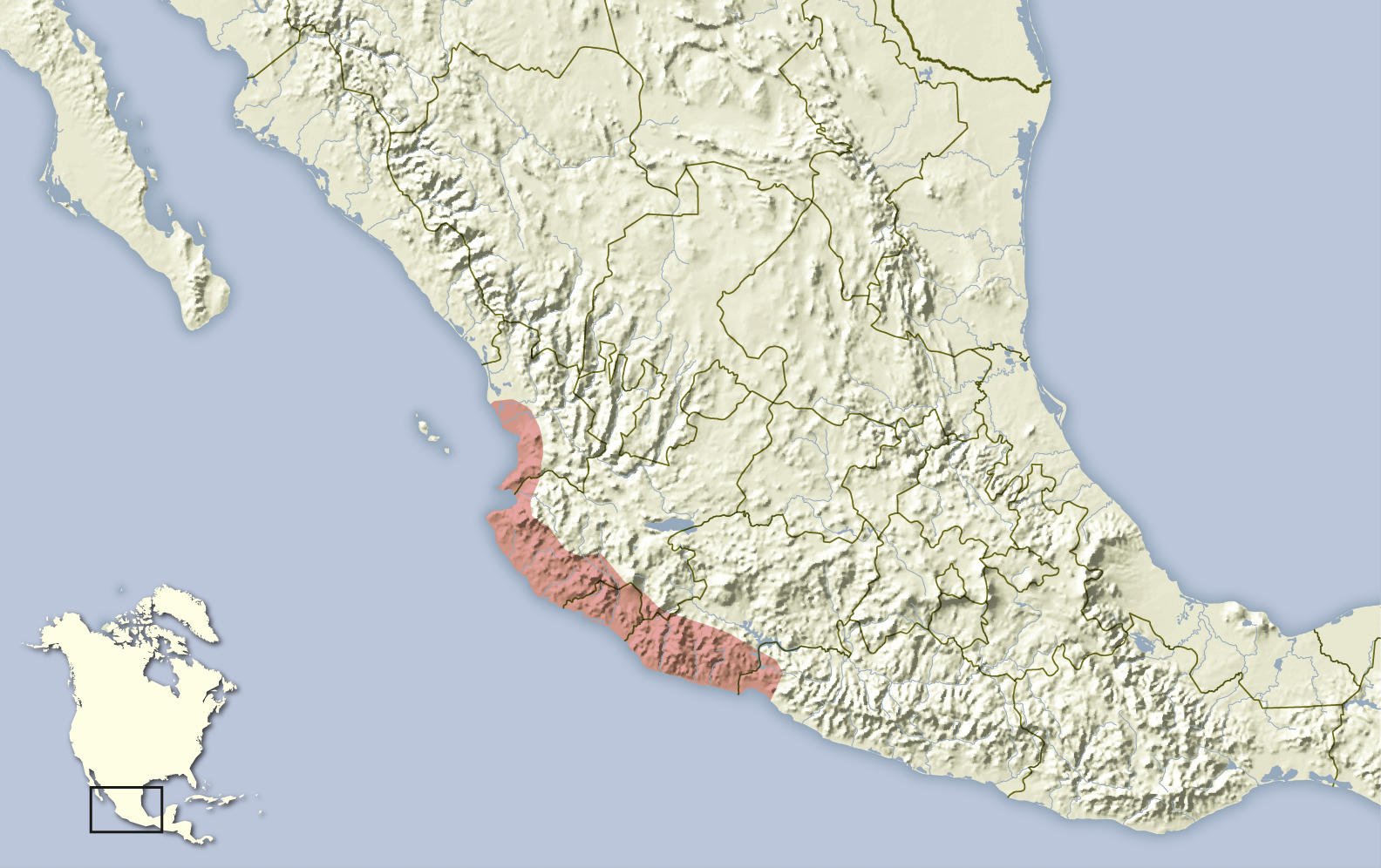
Distribution of the ring-tailed ground squirrel

The ring-tailed ground squirrel is endemic to western Mexico, with a range extending from the State of Nayarit to the State of Guerrero. It is a lowland species, ranging up to elevations of about 1,200 metres (3,900 ft). It occupies a range of habitat types. It may live in deciduous forests of vine-clad trees or on more open slopes among rocks. The species also inhabits the borders of cultivated fields, and oil palm (Elaeis guineensis) plantations where the ground is littered with fallen palm fronds and mesquite scrub. Its burrows are often in walls or dykes, or hidden under spreading cacti or scrub. It sometimes inhabits holes in trees.

== Behaviour ==
The ring-tailed ground squirrel eats corn and other seeds, but mainly feeds on fruit and nuts. Food includes oil palm seeds, wild figs, mesquite seeds and the fleshy fruits of prickly pears (Opuntia). The squirrel may also consume insects. It mostly moves about on the ground, scurrying from one piece of cover to another, sometimes pausing to dig up some morsel or sit on its haunches to eat, holding the food in its forepaws. It sometimes climbs a few metres up a small tree and gathers food from low branches. When startled, it may rush a short way up a tree, peer at the intruder, retire round the back of the trunk and descend to the ground, running away under cover to the nearest burrow. If startled in the open it may freeze, or may run directly to a burrow, often stopping at the entrance to utter a short whistle or emit chirping notes. When moving about, it sometimes stops and stands upright on its hind feet, propping itself up with its tail. When it runs, it carries its tail in a curve, and is altogether more dainty and agile than most ground squirrels.

Breeding takes place in the dry season between December and June; one female specimen found to be was carrying a litter of four embryos.

== Status ==
The ring-tailed ground squirrel is common in suitable locations within its range. The International Union for Conservation of Nature has identified no particular threats and has assessed its conservation status as being of "least concern".
