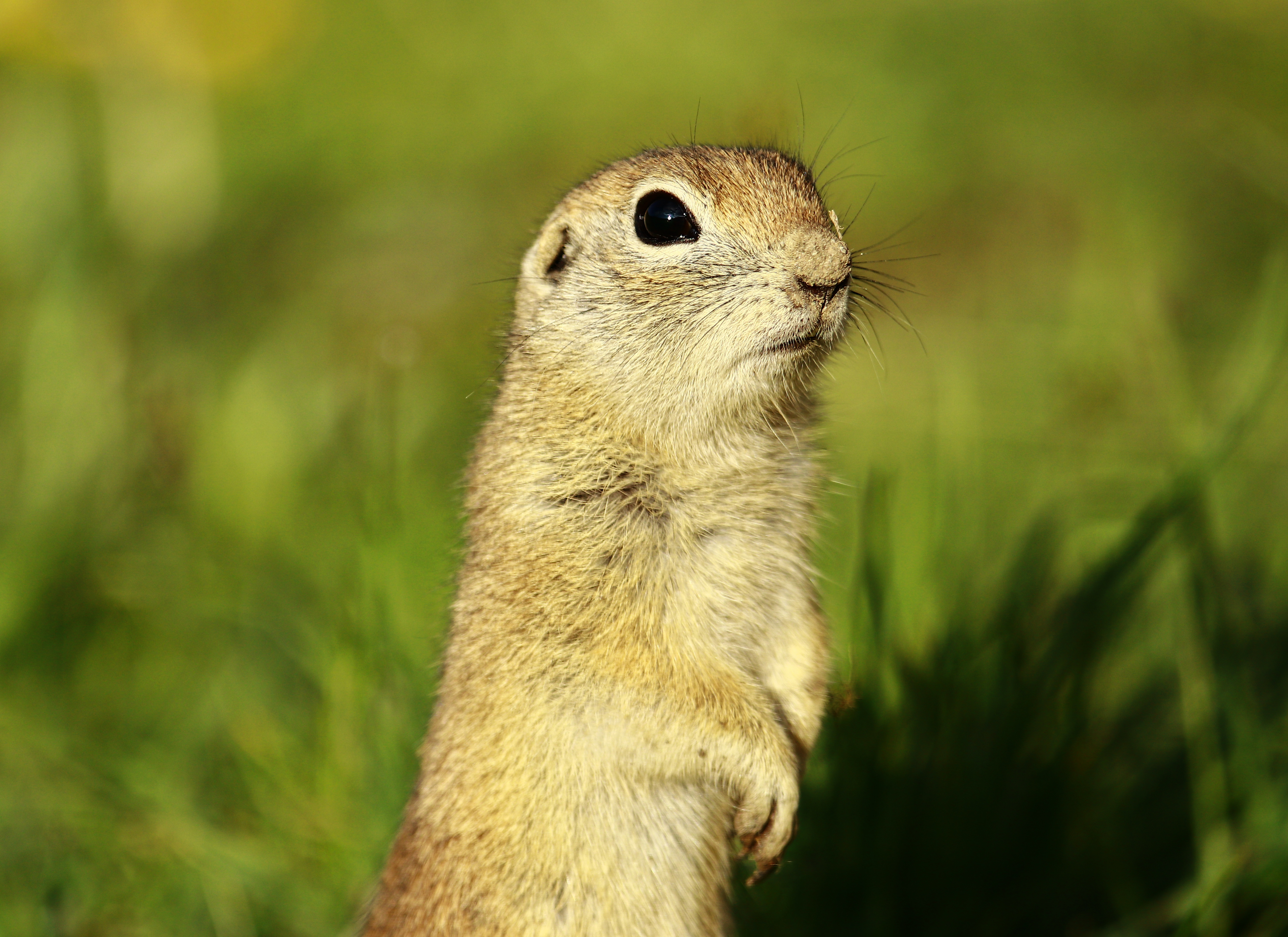
- Ground squirrel in Turkey

Scientific classification
- Kingdom: Animalia
- Phylum: Chordata
- Class: Mammalia
- Order: Rodentia
- Family: Sciuridae
- Subfamily: Xerinae
- Tribe: Marmotini; Pocock, 1923

Genera
- Palaeosciurus (fossil); Sciurotamias; Spermophilinus (fossil); Ammospermophilus; Spermophilus; Notocitellus; Otospermophilus; Callospermophilus; Xerospermophilus; Cynomys; Poliocitellus; Ictidomys; Arctomyoides (fossil); Miospermophilus (fossil); Paenemarmota (fossil); Palaearctomys (fossil); Protospermophilus (fossil); Marmota; Eutamias; Neotamias; Nototamias (fossil); Tamias; Urocitellus and see text

= Ground squirrel =

Ground squirrel Temporal range: Early Oligocene to recent

Type of ground-dwelling rodent

Ground squirrels are rodents of the squirrel family (Sciuridae) that generally live on the ground or in burrows, rather than in trees like the tree squirrels. The term is most often used for the medium-sized ground squirrels, as the larger ones are more commonly known as marmots (genus Marmota) or prairie dogs, while the smaller and less bushy-tailed ground squirrels tend to be known as chipmunks (genus Tamias).

Together, they make up the "marmot tribe" of squirrels, Marmotini, a clade within the large and mainly ground squirrel subfamily Xerinae, and containing six living genera. Well-known members of this largely Holarctic group are the marmots (Marmota), including the American groundhog, the chipmunks, the susliks (Spermophilus), and the prairie dogs (Cynomys). They are highly variable in size and habitus, but most are remarkably able to rise up on their hind legs and stand fully erect comfortably for prolonged periods. They also tend to be far more gregarious than other squirrels, and many live in colonies with complex social structures. Most Marmotini are rather short-tailed and large squirrels. At up to 8 kg (18 lb) or more, certain marmots are the heaviest squirrels.

The chipmunks of the genus Tamias frequently spend time in trees. Also closer to typical squirrels in other aspects, they are occasionally considered a tribe of their own (Tamiini).

== Evolution and systematics ==
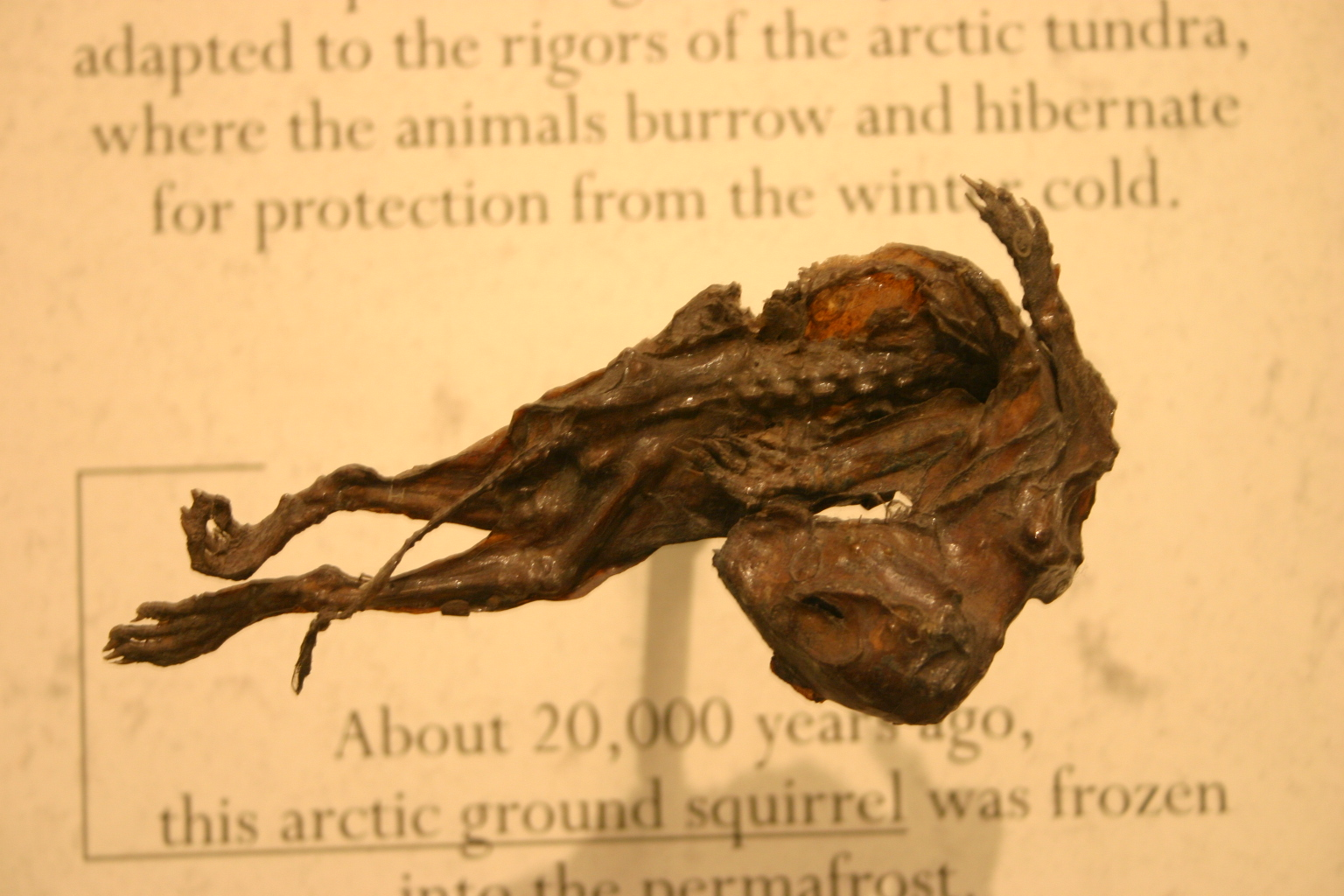
A 20,000-year-old Arctic ground squirrel mummy

Palaeosciurus from Europe is the oldest known ground squirrel species, and it does not seem to be particularly close to any of the two to three living lineages (subtribes) of Marmotini. The oldest fossils are from the Early Oligocene, more than 30 million years ago (Mya), but the genus probably persisted at least until the mid-Miocene, some 15 Mya.

Where the Marmotini originated is unclear. The subtribes probably diverged in the early to mid-Oligocene, as primitive marmots and chipmunks are known from the Late Oligocene of North America. The fossil record of the "true" ground squirrels is less well known, beginning only in the mid-Miocene, when modern susliks and prairie dogs are known to have inhabited their present-day range already.

Whether the Marmotini dispersed between North America and Eurasia via "island-hopping" across the Bering Straits or the Greenland region—both of which were temperate habitat at that time—and from which continent they dispersed to which, or if both continents brought forth distinct subtribes which then spread to the other, is not known and would probably require more fossil material to be resolved.

In any case, the fairly comprehensive fossil record of Europe—at the relevant time separated from Asia by the Turgai Sea—lacks ancient Marmotini except the indeterminate Palaeosciurus, which might be taken to indicate an East Asian or western North American origin with trans-Beringia dispersal being the slightly more satisfying hypothesis. This is also supported by the enigmatic Chinese genus Sciurotamias, which may be the most ancient living lineage of this group, or—if the chipmunks are not included here—close to the common ancestor of the Tamiini and the Marmotini sensu stricto.

In any case, expansion of the Marmotini to Africa was probably prevented by competitive exclusion by their close relatives the Protoxerini and Xerini—the native terrestrial and palm squirrels of that continent, which must have evolved at the same time as the Marmotini did.

=== Size ===
Ground squirrels can measure anywhere from about 7.2 inches (18 cm) in height up to nearly 30 inches (76 cm). They can weigh between 0.09 pounds (0.041 kg) and 24 pounds (11 kg).

=== Habitat ===
Open areas including rocky outcrops, fields, pastures, and sparsely wooded hillsides comprise their habitat. Ground squirrels also live in grassy areas such as pastures, golf courses, cemeteries, and parks.

=== Defense mechanisms ===
Ground squirrels have developed several defense mechanisms to protect themselves from predators. When threatened, they emit high-pitched warning calls to alert others in their colony. This alarm call serves as an early warning system, allowing nearby squirrels to seek cover. The squirrels spend about one-third of their time standing to watch and when a predator is in sight, they stop and watch 60% of the time.

Ground squirrels are also known for their burrowing behavior. They have intricate tunnel systems with multiple entrances, which provide escape routes from predators. When a threat approaches, they quickly retreat underground, where they are safe from most predators. Their burrows are designed with multiple chambers and ranges between 5 and 30 feet (1.5 and 9.1 m), making it challenging for predators to reach them. This combination of vocal warnings and burrow construction makes ground squirrels highly adapted to evade danger and survive in the wild.

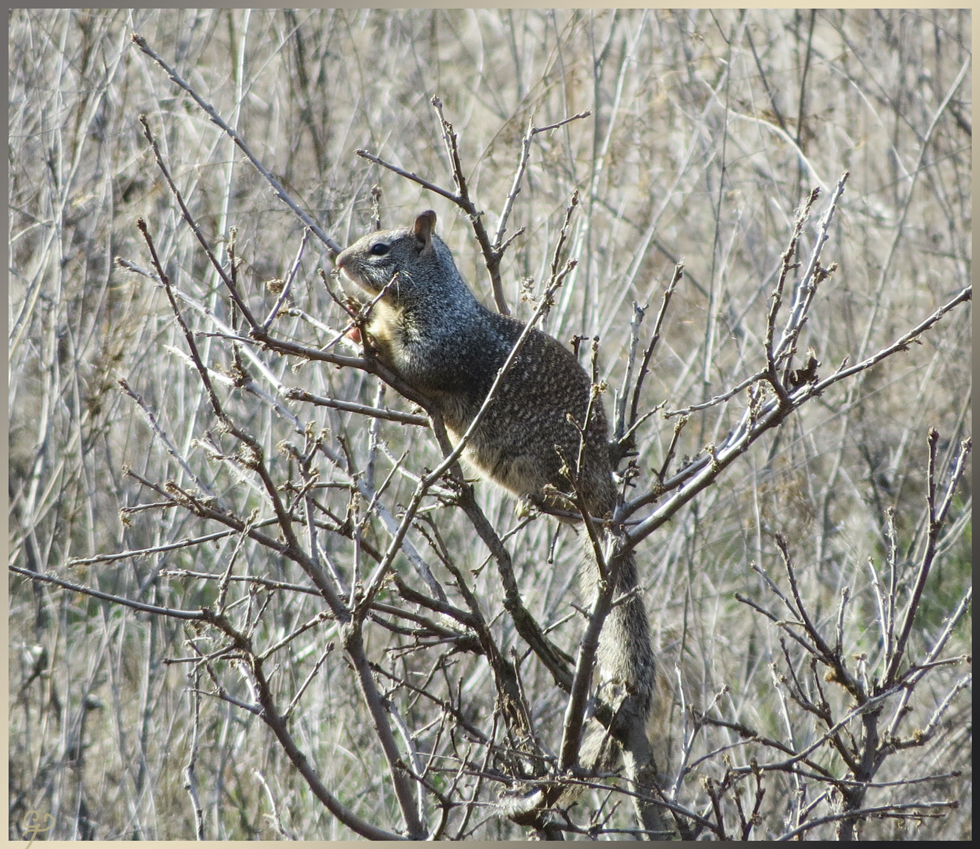
A California ground squirrel (Otospermophilus beecheyi) in a tree

=== Diet ===
Ground squirrels are omnivorous, and eat a diet rich in fungi, nuts, fruits, and seeds, and occasionally eat insects, eggs, and other small animals.

=== Subtribes and genera ===
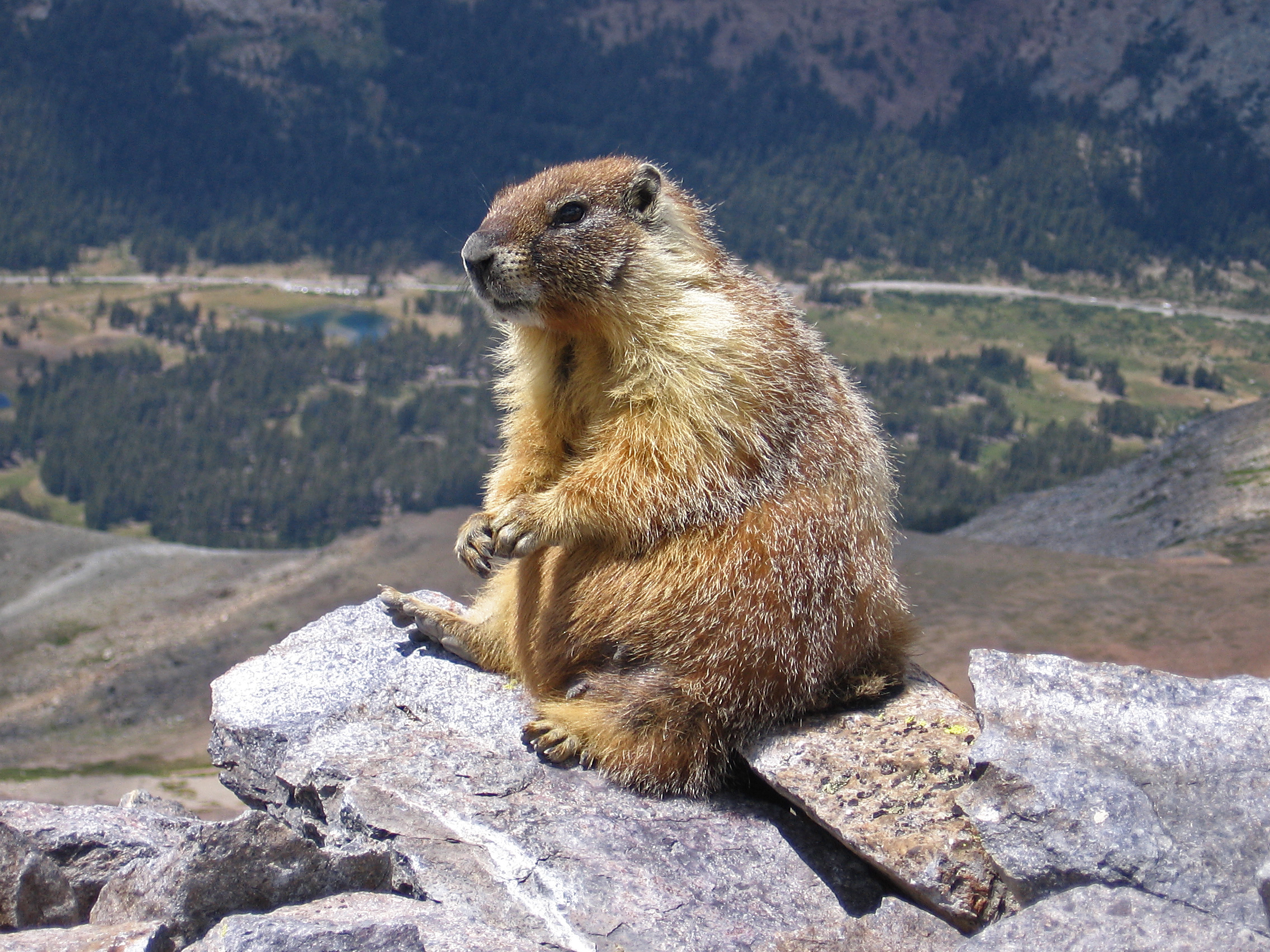
A watchful "rock chuck" or yellow-bellied marmot (Marmota flaviventris) atop Mount Dana, Yosemite National Park in California

Basal and incertae sedis genera

- †Palaeosciurus (fossil)
- Callospermophilus
- Notocitellus
- Otospermophilus (American rock squirrels)
- Poliocitellus (Franklin's ground squirrel)
- Sciurotamias (Chinese rock squirrels)
- Urocitellus
- Xerospermophilus

Subtribe Tamiina: chipmunks (might be full tribe)

- Eutamias
- Neotamias
- †Nototamias (fossil)
- Tamias

Subtribe Marmotina: marmots and prairie dogs

- †Arctomyoides (fossil)
- †Miospermophilus (fossil)
- †Paenemarmota (fossil)
- †Palaearctomys (fossil)
- †Protospermophilus (fossil)
- Marmota
- Cynomys (prairie dogs)

Subtribe Spermophilina: true ground squirrels

- †Spermophilinus (fossil)
- Ammospermophilus
- Ictidomys: Thirteen-lined ground squirrel and related species
- Spermophilus

== Cladogram ==
Below is a partial cladogram of ground squirrels (tribe Marmotini, but excluding the Tamiina subtribe and some basal genera) derived from maximum parsimony analysis.

- - - ⊞Notocitellus
      ⊟
      - N. adocetus
      - N. annulatus
    - ⊞Ammospermophilus
      ⊟
      - A. harrisii
      - - A. leucurus
        - - A. harrisii
          - A. interpres
  - - - ⊞Otospermophilus
        ⊟
        - - O. atricapillus
          - O. beecheyi
        - O. variegatus
      - ⊞Callospermophilus
        ⊟
        - C. saturatus
        - - C. lateralis
          - C. madrensis
    - - ⊞Marmota
        ⊟
        - M. monax
        - M. marmota
        - - M. flaviventris
          - - M. caligata
            - - M. olympus
              - M. vancouveriensis
        - - - M. broweri
            - - M. menzbieri
              - M. caudata
          - - - M. baibacina
              - M. bobak
            - - M. camtschatica
              - - M. himalayana
                - M. sibirica
- - ⊞Spermophilus
    ⊟
    - - S. musicus
      - - S. pygmaeus
        - - S. major
          - S. pygmaeus
    - - - - S. dauricus
          - S. xanthopyrmnus
        - S. suslicus
      - - S. citellus
        - - S. relictus
          - - S. erythrogenys
            - - S. citellus
              - - S. pallidicauda
                - - S. fulvus
                  - - S. erythrogenys
                    - S. major
  - - - ⊞Ictidomys
        ⊟
        - I. mexicanus
        - - I. parvidens
          - I. tridecemlineatus
      - - Poliocitellus
          P. franklinii
        - - ⊞Cynomys
            ⊟
            - - C. ludovicianus
              - C. mexicanus
            - - C. parvidens
              - - C. gunnisoni
                - C. leucurus
          - ⊞Xerospermophilus
            ⊟
            - - X. mohavensis
              - X. tereticaudus
            - - X. spilosoma
              - - X. perotensis
                - X. spilosoma
    - ⊞Urocitellus
      ⊟
      - U. townsendii
      - - U. washingtonii
        - - - U. brunnenus
            - - U. townsendii
              - - U. mollis
                - U. townsendii
          - - - U. armatus
              - U. beldingi
            - - U. columbianus
              - - U. undulatus
                - - U. parryii
                  - - U. elegans
                    - U. richardsonii
                  - U. parryii

== See also ==
- Tree squirrel
- Xerini – the related "ground squirrels" of Asia and Africa
