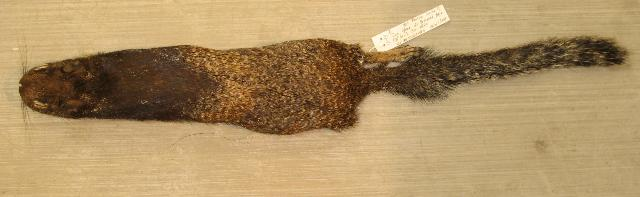

Conservation status
- Endangered (IUCN 3.1)

Scientific classification
- Kingdom: Animalia
- Phylum: Chordata
- Class: Mammalia
- Order: Rodentia
- Family: Sciuridae
- Genus: Otospermophilus
- Species: O. atricapillus

Binomial name
- Otospermophilus atricapillus (W. E. Bryant, 1889)

Synonyms
- Spermophilus atricapillus W. E. Bryant, 1889

= Baja California rock squirrel =

Species of rodent

The Baja California rock squirrel (Otospermophilus atricapillus) is a species of rodent in the family Sciuridae. It is endemic to Baja California, Mexico. Otospermophilus atricapillus is considered as the sister species of Otospermophilus beecheyi and both have been considered different species mainly by its colorations. The rock squirrel is a relatively large ground squirrel, with males typically larger than females. Their fur is generally gray with a mottled or variegated pattern, giving them a distinctive appearance. Their tails are long and bushy, often used for balance and communication. Their heads are broad with small, rounded ears and large, expressive eyes.

== Distribution ==
Rock squirrels are primarily found in the southwestern United States and northern Mexico. They are well-adapted to arid and semi-arid environments, including rocky hillsides and deserts. Common states where you can find rock squirrels include Texas, New Mexico, Arizona, and parts of Colorado and Utah. They often make their homes in crevices, rock piles, and burrows, which provide ample shelter and protection from predators.

== Ecology ==
This species is poorly known. It is found in desert shrubland and open mountain forests in areas of volcanic origin. Vegetation is dominated by Pachycereus pringlei (cardon), Machaerocereus gummosus (pitaya agria), Lemairocereus thurberi (pitaya dulce), Opuntia cholla (choya), Prosopis juliflora (mesquite), Lysiloma candida (palo blanco), Burcera ceraciflora (torote) and Jatropha cinerea (lomboy). This species is primarily found near water holes in the Gigantas Sierra and Sierra de San Francisco. It feeds on Datil plants. Because of this specific habitat preference, populations are very isolated and fragmented.

== Population ==
The Baja California rock squirrel (Otospermophilus atricapillus) populations are genetically different from California ground squirrel (O. beecheyi) to a sufficient extent to be considered as a different species, and Baja California rock squirrel (Otospermophilus atricapillus) will have larger genetic variation than the current variation within the recognized subspecies (based on geographical location) of California ground squirrel (O. beecheyi) (O. beecheyi beecheyi, O. b. douglasii, O. b. fisheri, O. b. nudipes, O. b. parvulus, O. b. rupinarum, and O. b. sierrae).

== Feeding ==
The Baja California rock squirrel eats a variety of seeds and fruits, including juniper, cactus, mesquite, agave, currants, grasses, and pine nuts. Also eats bird eggs and young. Forages on the ground and in trees and shrubs.

== Reproduction ==
Breeding typically occurs in the spring and summer months . Females usually give birth to one or two litters per year, with an average of 4-6 young per litter. The gestation period for rock squirrels is approximately 30 days. The young are born altricial (blind and hairless) and develop rapidly over the following weeks. Juveniles begin emerging from the burrow several weeks after birth.

== Conservation status ==
The Baja California rock squirrel is listed as Endangered (EN) on the IUCN Red List of Threatened Species due to its limited range and ongoing threats from habitat degradation, including land development and agricultural expansion. Conservation efforts are limited, and further studies are needed to assess population trends and ecological requirements.
