= Sabicu wood =

Sabicu wood or sabicu is the wood of at least two species of the genus Lysiloma. Lysiloma sabicu occurs sparingly in the Bahamas, Jamaica, Haiti and the Dominican Republic, and Cuba. It was named by George Bentham (1800-1884) from a Cuban specimen examined in 1854. Bentham went on to identify a second species, Lysiloma latisiliquum, which grows best in the Bahamas. The latter is commonly known as 'wild tamarind' or 'false tamarind'. The wood of both species is similar, being mid-brown in colour, sometimes with a reddish hue, heavy (specific gravity of 0.40-0.75) hard and durable. Some timber is well figured, but most relatively plain. The wood has been used in construction, shipbuilding and in furniture making, although its weight is a distinct drawback for the latter purpose. The stairs of The Crystal Palace in London, in which The Great Exhibition of 1851 was held, were made of sabicu due to its durability. Despite the enormous traffic that passed over them, the wood at the end was found to be little affected by wear.

There is some confusion in the published literature between L. sabicu and L. latisiliquum, although there is little doubt that the former was the most important commercial species. There is also confusion with other Bahamian species colloquially known as 'tamarind', several of which were also called sabicu. The most common of these are Peltophorum dubium var. adnatum and Cojoba arborea. At various times their wood has also been called 'horseflesh mahogany'. The Economic Botany Collection at the Royal Botanic Gardens, Kew, London, contains specimens of wood from all these species collected at various times in the 19th and early 20th centuries. The labelling evinces considerable confusion, but it seems likely that 'horseflesh mahogany' properly applies to Peltophorum and Cojoba, while sabicu applies to Lysiloma.
