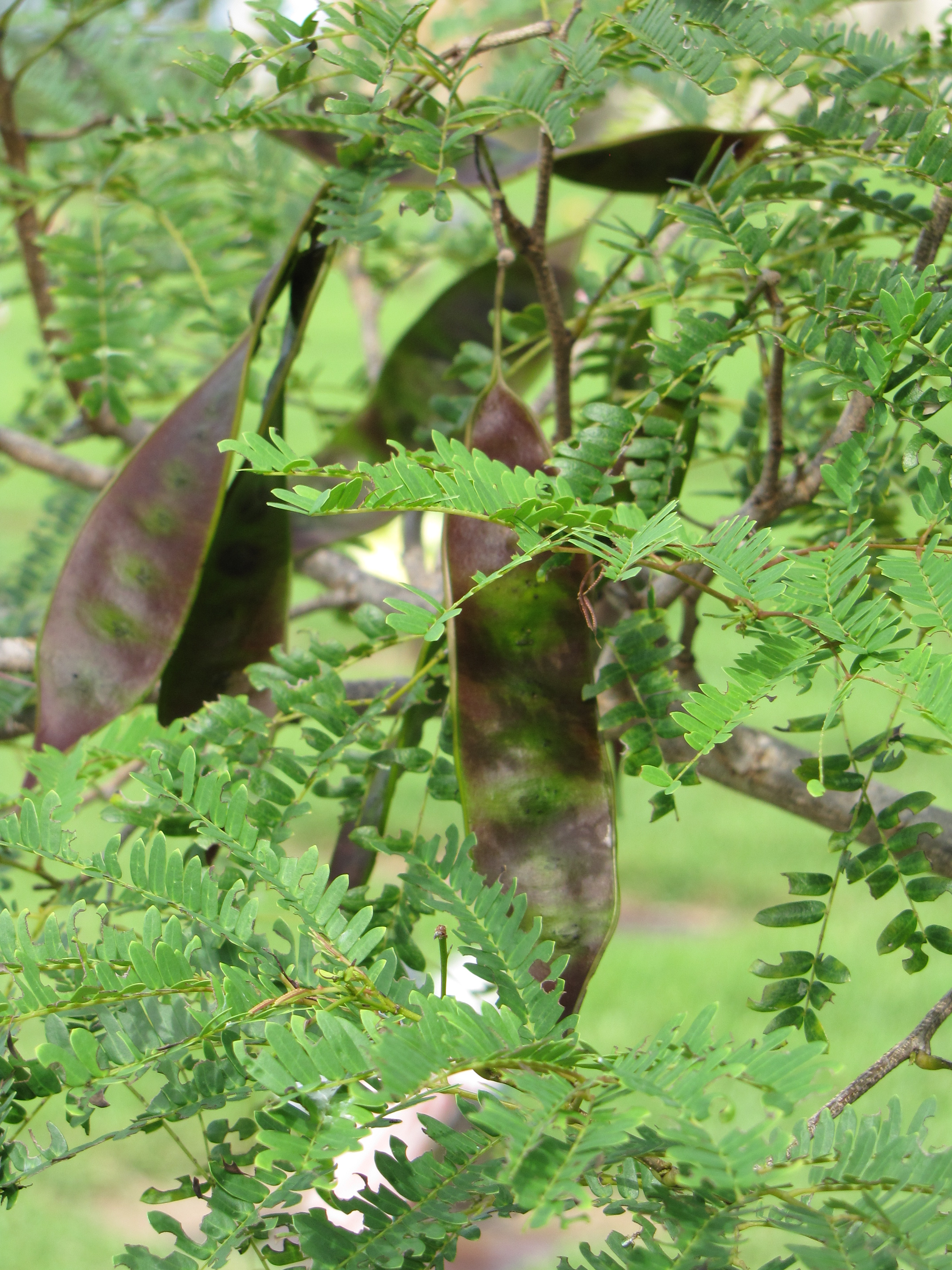
- Lysiloma latisiliquum leaves and seedpods

Scientific classification
- Kingdom: Plantae
- Clade: Tracheophytes
- Clade: Angiosperms
- Clade: Eudicots
- Clade: Rosids
- Order: Fabales
- Family: Fabaceae
- Subfamily: Caesalpinioideae
- Clade: Mimosoid clade
- Genus: Lysiloma; Benth.

= Lysiloma =

Genus of legumes

Lysiloma is a genus of flowering plants belonging to the family Fabaceae.

The genus is native to the Americas, and species range from Arizona and New Mexico through Mexico and Central America to Costa Rica, and in Florida, Cuba, Hispaniola, the Bahamas, and Turks and Caicos Islands.

== Species ==
There are eight accepted species:

- Lysiloma acapulcense (Kunth) Benth. – Mexico to Nicaragua
- Lysiloma auritum (Schltdl.) Benth. – southern Mexico to Costa Rica
- Lysiloma candidum Brandegee – Baja California Peninsula
- Lysiloma divaricatum (Jacq.) J.F.Macbr. – Mexico to Costa Rica
- Lysiloma latisiliquum (L.) Benth. – false tamarind. Southern Mexico, Belize, Cuba, Bahamas, Turks & Caicos, Florida.
- Lysiloma sabicu Benth. – sabicu, horseflesh. Southeastern Mexico, Cuba, Hispaniola, Bahamas, Florida
- Lysiloma tergeminum Benth. central and southwestern Mexico
- Lysiloma watsonii Rose – littleleaf false tamarind, featherbush, feather tree. Native to southeastern Arizona's Rincon Mountains and in Sonora, Mexico.

=== Formerly placed here ===
- Lysiloma ambiguum and L. vogeliana were reclassified as Parasenegalia vogeliana
- Lysiloma polyphyllum was reclassified as Parasenegalia visco
