= Lysiloma watsonii =

Scientific classification
- Kingdom: Plantae
- Clade: Tracheophytes
- Clade: Angiosperms
- Clade: Eudicots
- Clade: Rosids
- Order: Fabales
- Family: Fabaceae
- Subfamily: Caesalpinioideae
- Clade: Mimosoid clade
- Genus: Lysiloma
- Species: L. watsonii

Binomial name
- Lysiloma watsonii Rose

Species of tree

Lysiloma watsonii is a species of flowering tree in the family Fabaceae family, also known as littleleaf false tamarind, desert fern tree, feather tree or feather bush.

== Description ==
Lysiloma watsonii is a winter evergreen tree with alternate leaf arrangement and bi-pinnately compound leaves. There are six to eight pairs of pinnae with 20 to 25 pairs of leaflets, that are three-sixteenth of an inch long. These leaves are bright green and feathery and may partially lose its leaves in late spring. Flowers are small, fluffy, pale cream colored balls borne in terminal clusters in late spring. Fruits are dry indehiscent, moderately flat, legume pods growing 4 to 6 inches long and about 1 inch wide. The impression of the large disk-shaped seeds can be seen on the surface of the thin pod covering.

Height: 11' to 15' feet
Width: 11' to 15' feet
Growth rate: Fast Growing
Grow season: Spring
Flower color: Cream
Water use: Moderate water use

== Range ==
Lysiloma watsonii is native to and cultivated mostly in the southern United States near Arizona, as well as in northern Sonora Mexico.
