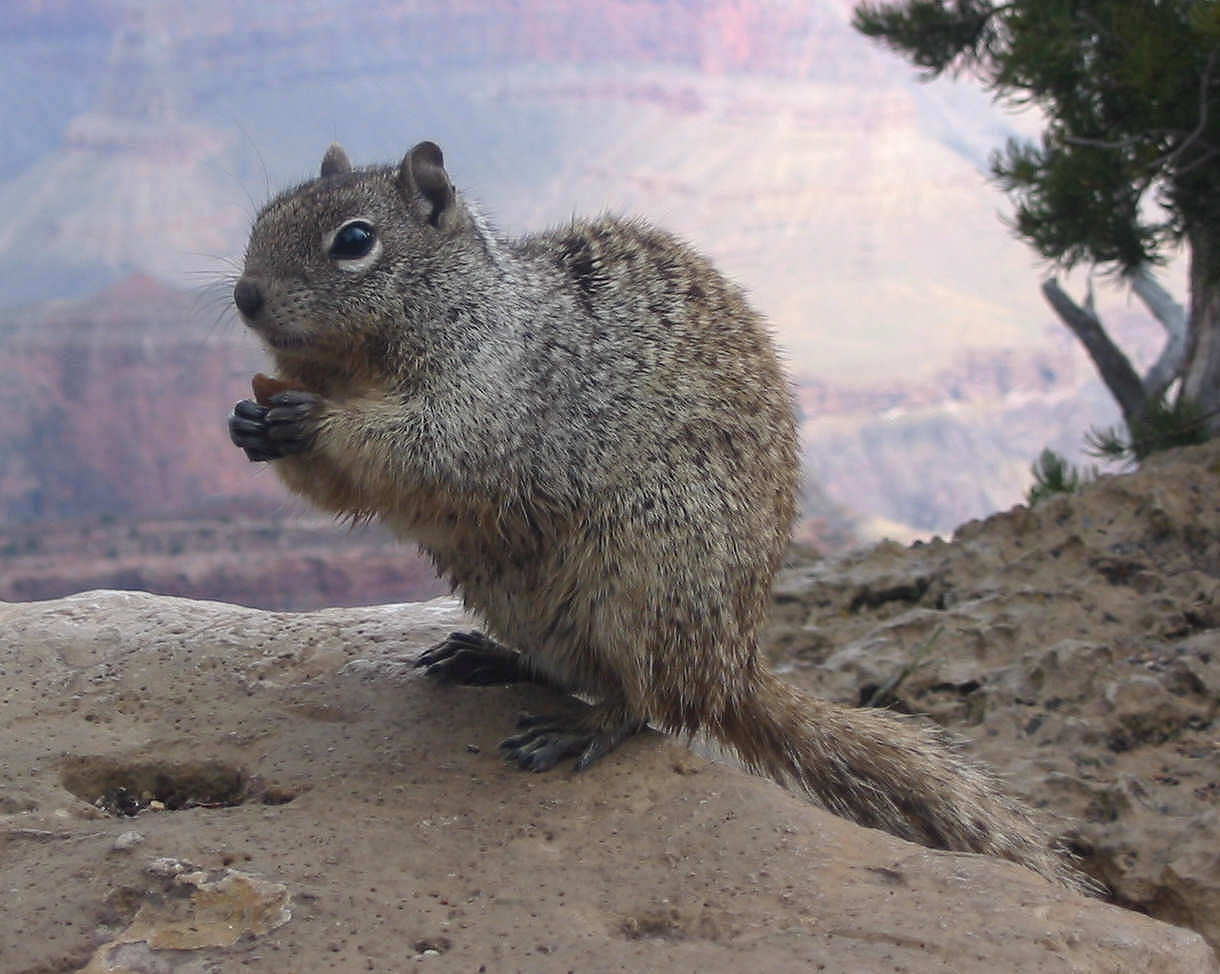
- Rock squirrel at the Grand Canyon

Scientific classification
- Kingdom: Animalia
- Phylum: Chordata
- Class: Mammalia
- Order: Rodentia
- Family: Sciuridae
- Tribe: Marmotini
- Genus: Otospermophilus; Brandt, 1844

Type species
- Sciurus grammurus Say, 1823 (= Sciurus variegatus Erxleben, 1777)

Species
- O. atricapillus O. beecheyi O. variegetus

= Otospermophilus =

Genus of rodents

Otospermophilus is a genus of ground squirrels in the family Sciuridae, containing three species from Mexico and the United States. Otospermophilus was formerly placed in the large ground squirrel genus Spermophilus, as a subgenus or species group. Since DNA sequencing of the cytochrome b gene has shown Spermophilus to be paraphyletic to the prairie dogs and marmots, it is now separated, along with six other genera.

== Species ==
The three species in Otospermophilus are listed below. These are the same species that were previously grouped in the subgenus Otospermophilus.

- Baja California rock squirrel, Otospermophilus atricapillus
- California ground squirrel, Otospermophilus beecheyi
- Rock squirrel, Otospermophilus variegatus
