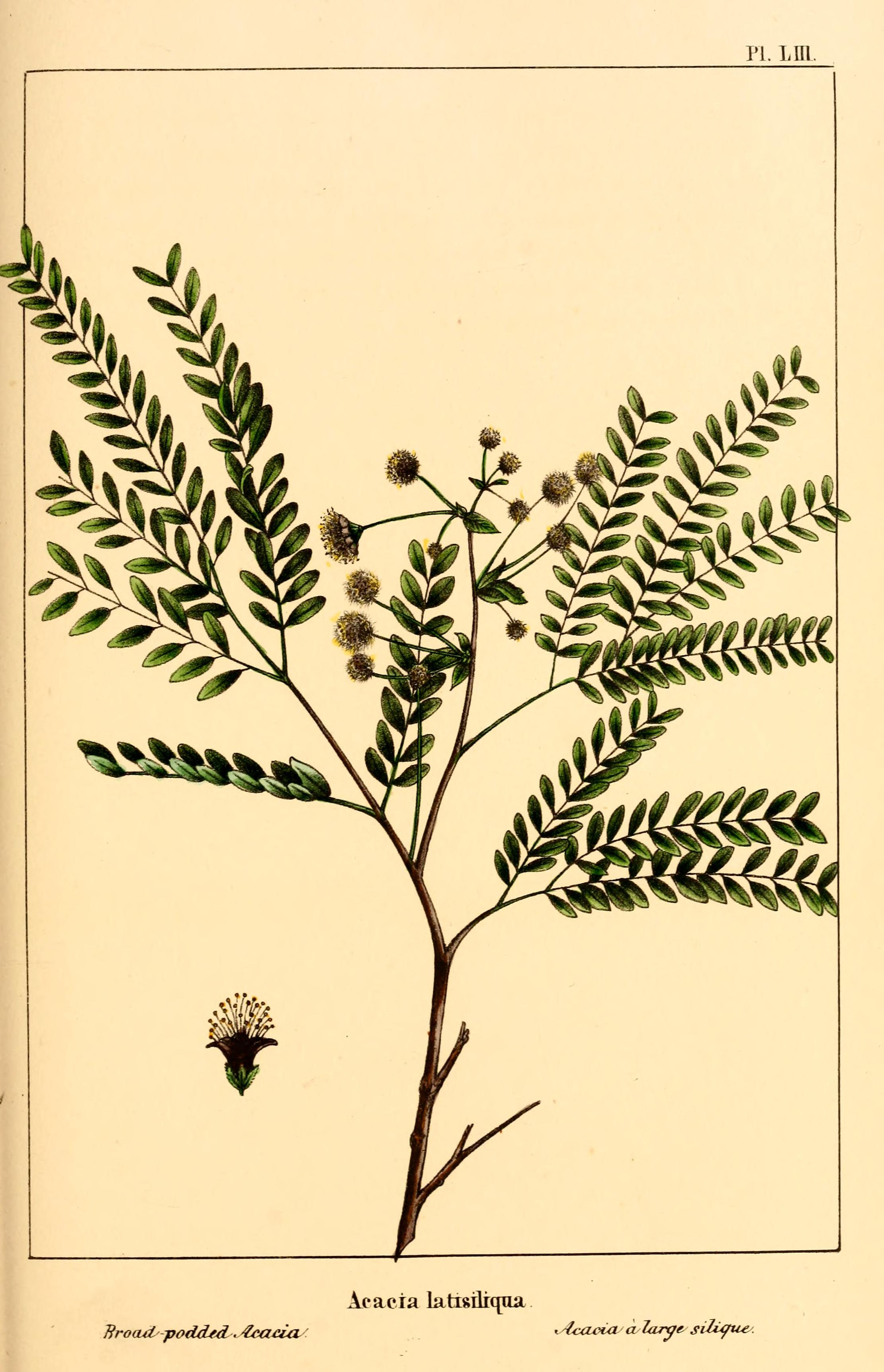

Conservation status
- Least Concern (IUCN 3.1)

Scientific classification
- Kingdom: Plantae
- Clade: Tracheophytes
- Clade: Angiosperms
- Clade: Eudicots
- Clade: Rosids
- Order: Fabales
- Family: Fabaceae
- Subfamily: Caesalpinioideae
- Clade: Mimosoid clade
- Genus: Lysiloma
- Species: L. latisiliquum

Binomial name
- Lysiloma latisiliquum (L.) Benth.

Synonyms
- Acacia bahamensis (Benth.) Griseb. Acacia latisiliqua (L.) Willd. Leucaena latisiliqua (L.) Gillis; Lysiloma bahamense Benth. Lysiloma bahamensis Benth. Mimosa latisiliqua L.

= Lysiloma latisiliquum =

Species of legume

Lysiloma latisiliquum, commonly known as false tamarind or wild tamarind, is a species of tree in the family Fabaceae, that is native to southern Florida in the United States, the Bahamas, Cuba, southern Mexico, and Belize. Its wood is sometimes traded as sabicu wood. The tannin-rich leaves have anti-parasitic properties, and are eaten by sheep as an adaptation to alleviate nematode infections.
