= Parasenegalia =

- Parasenegalia visco

Scientific classification
- Kingdom: Plantae
- Clade: Tracheophytes
- Clade: Angiosperms
- Clade: Eudicots
- Clade: Rosids
- Order: Fabales
- Family: Fabaceae
- Subfamily: Caesalpinioideae
- Clade: Mimosoid clade
- Genus: Parasenegalia; Seigler & Ebinger, 2017

Type species
- Parasenegalia skleroxyla (Tussac) Seigler & Ebinger (2017)

Species
- 11; see text.

Synonyms
- Acacia subg. Aculeiferum "skleroxyla" group

Genus of legumes

Parasenegalia is a small genus of flowering plants in the legume family, Fabaceae. It belongs to the subfamily Mimosoideae. It is found in tropical areas of the Caribbean, Central America, and South America.

== Species list ==
The genus Parasenegalia comprises the following species:

- Parasenegalia amorimii (M.J.F.Barros & M.P.Lima) Seigler & Ebinger (2018)
- Parasenegalia grazielae (M.J.F.Barros & M.P.Lima) Seigler & Ebinger (2018)
- Parasenegalia incerta (Hoehne) Seigler & Ebinger (2018)
- Parasenegalia lundellii Seigler & Ebinger (2017)
- Parasenegalia miersii (Benth.) Seigler & Ebinger (2018)
- Parasenegalia muricata (L.) Seigler & Ebinger (2017)
- Parasenegalia rurrenabaqueana (Rusby) Seigler & Ebinger (2017)
- Parasenegalia santosii (G.P.Lewis) Seigler & Ebinger (2017)
- Parasenegalia skleroxyla (Tussac) Seigler & Ebinger (2017)
- Parasenegalia visco (Lorentz ex Griseb.) Seigler & Ebinger (2017)
- Parasenegalia vogeliana (Steud.) Seigler & Ebinger (2017)

== See also ==
- Acacia
- Acaciella
- Mariosousa
- Pseudosenegalia
- Senegalia
- Vachellia
