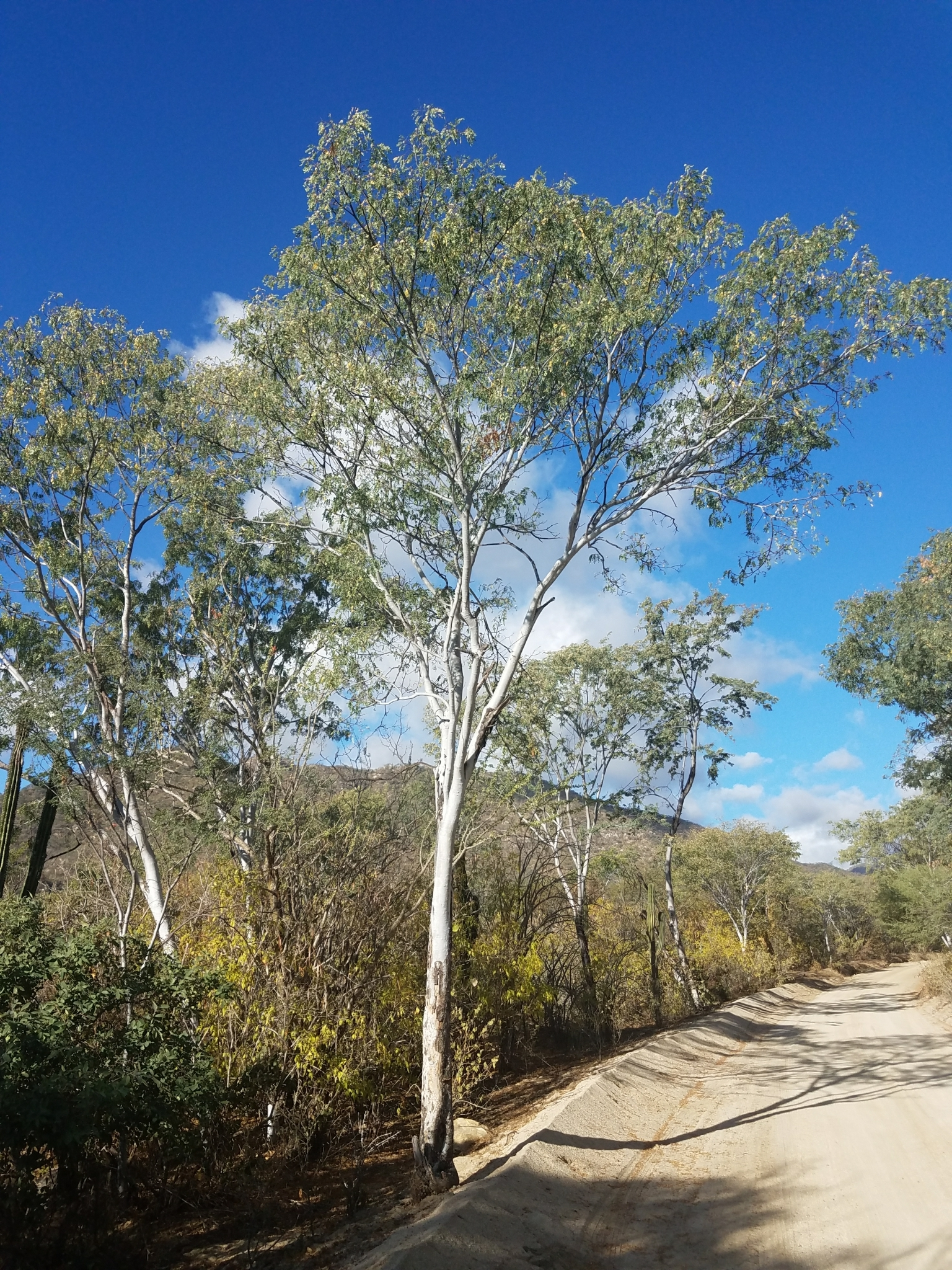

Scientific classification
- Kingdom: Plantae
- Clade: Embryophytes
- Clade: Tracheophytes
- Clade: Angiosperms
- Clade: Eudicots
- Clade: Rosids
- Order: Fabales
- Family: Fabaceae
- Subfamily: Caesalpinioideae
- Clade: Mimosoid clade
- Genus: Lysiloma
- Species: L. candidum

Binomial name
- Lysiloma candidum Brandegee

Synonyms
- Orthographic variants: Lysiloma candida

= Lysiloma candidum =

Palo blanco

Species of tree found in Mexico

Lysiloma candidum, most commonly known as the palo blanco, is a tree of the family Fabaceae near-endemic to the Baja California Peninsula in Mexico. It may grow to a height of 10 metres (33 ft) and is one of the few spineless woody legumes in the region. It has compound leaves with oval gray-green leaflets. The creamy-white, globose clusters of flowers bloom in March through May and perfume the air with a light, spicy fragrance. The flowers are followed by red-brown pods up to 15 centimetres (5.9 in) long that hang delicately on the thin branches. This species is distributed throughout the Baja California Peninsula, from Rancho El Barril in southern Baja California state to the Cape region of Baja California Sur, and is also very rarely found in the state of Sonora.

== Description ==
Lysiloma candidum generally grows as a slender, straight, and dichotomously branched trunked tree up to 10 metres (33 ft) in height. The bark is smooth and silvery white, but dark on the small branches. The compound leaves are 3 to 7 cm long, with 1 to 3 pairs of pinnae. Each pinnae has 5 to 17 pairs of gray-green to blue-green oval leaflets, 8 to 22 mm long. The pinnate veins continue to the margin. The stipules are leaf-like, shaped oblong, oblique, and 6 to 15 mm long.

The bracts are small and caducous. The flowers are capitate, with the heads pedunculate in short racemes or clusters. The bracteoles are similar to the calyx lobes but shorter. The calyx is 3 mm long, and the corolla is 3.5 mm long. The corolla and calyx lobes are pubescent (covered in hairs) and are thickened at the tip. There are 40 to 50 stamens united in a tube. The flowers form globose clusters of flowers with a creamy-white color, blooming from March through May. The flowers give off a light, spicy fragrance in the air around the plant.

The fruit is a pod, suspended on a short stipe, hanging gracefully off of the slender branches. The pod is 8 to 15 cm long, and 25 to 30 mm wide, smooth, and reddish-brown. The thin walls of the pod fall away during dehiscence.

=== Taxonomy ===
This species was described by Townshend Stith Brandegee in 1889.

== Distribution and habitat ==
This plant is a near-endemic to the Baja California Peninsula in Mexico, with a small occurrence in Sonora. On the peninsula, it occurs from Rancho El Barril in southeast Baja California state, along the gulf side of the peninsula into Baja California Sur, reaching the Cape region. It is also found on the adjacent islands in the Gulf of California. In Sonora, it is found on the west coast facing the Gulf.

== Gallery ==
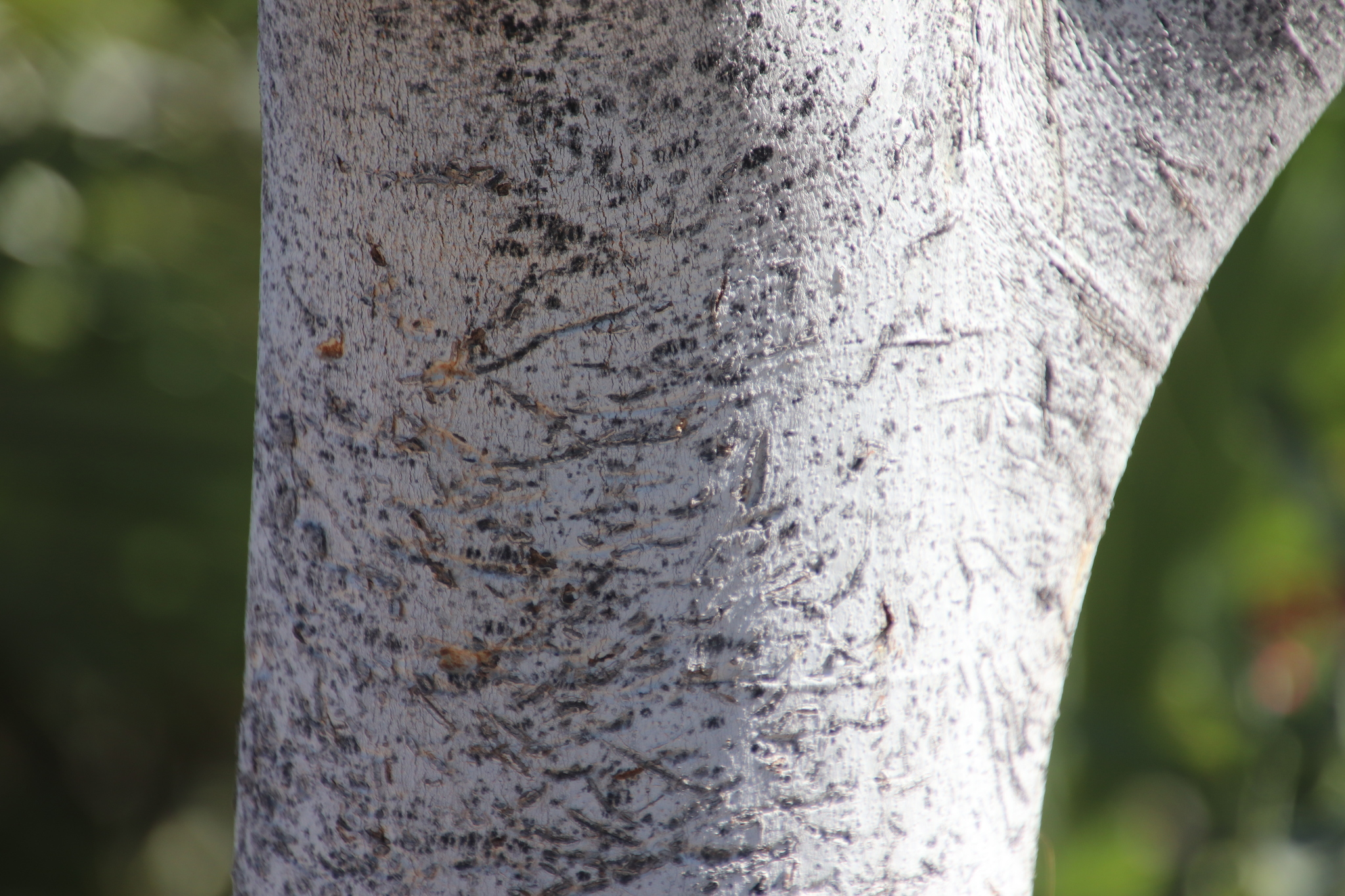
White bark

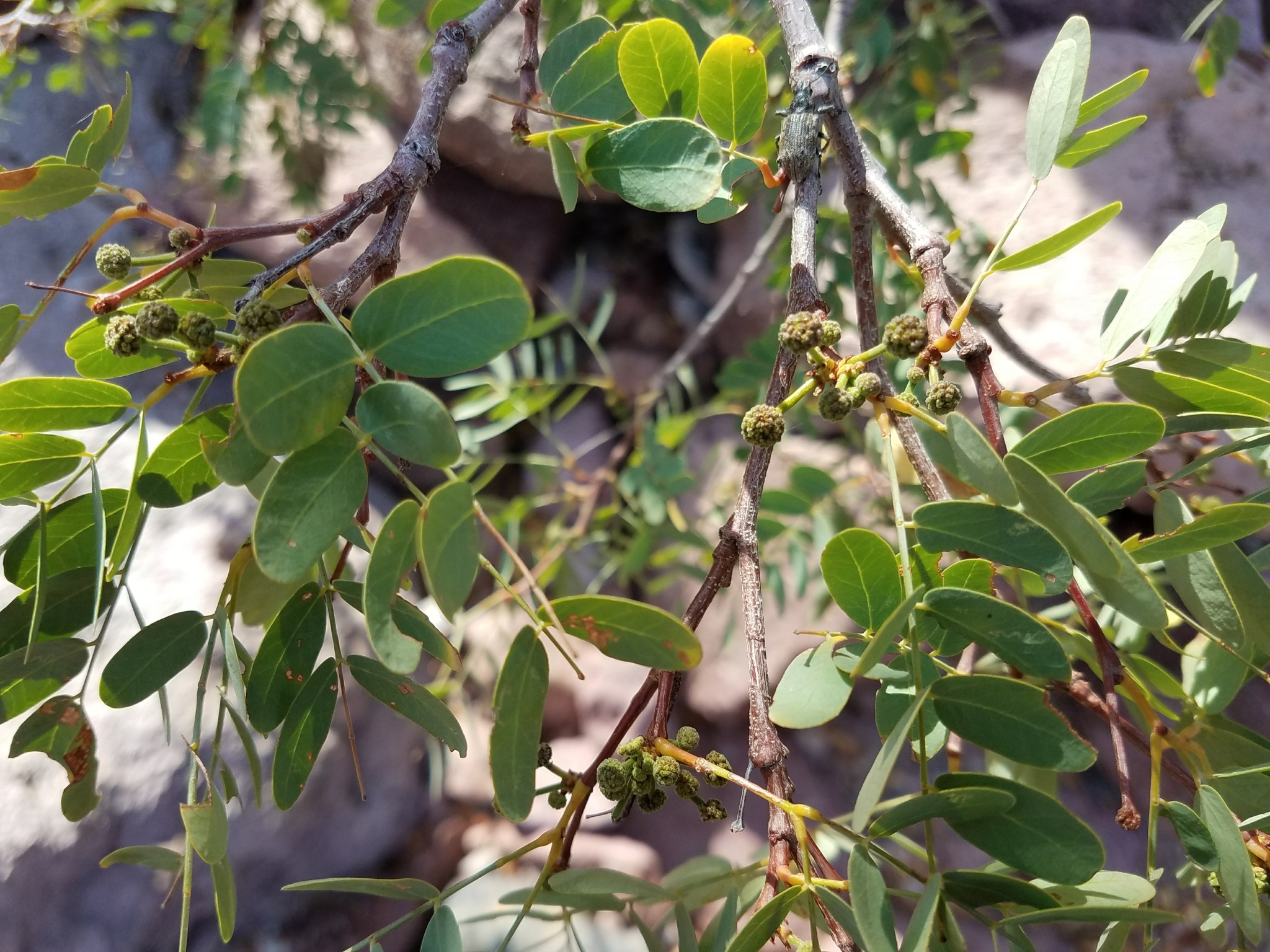
Detail of leaves

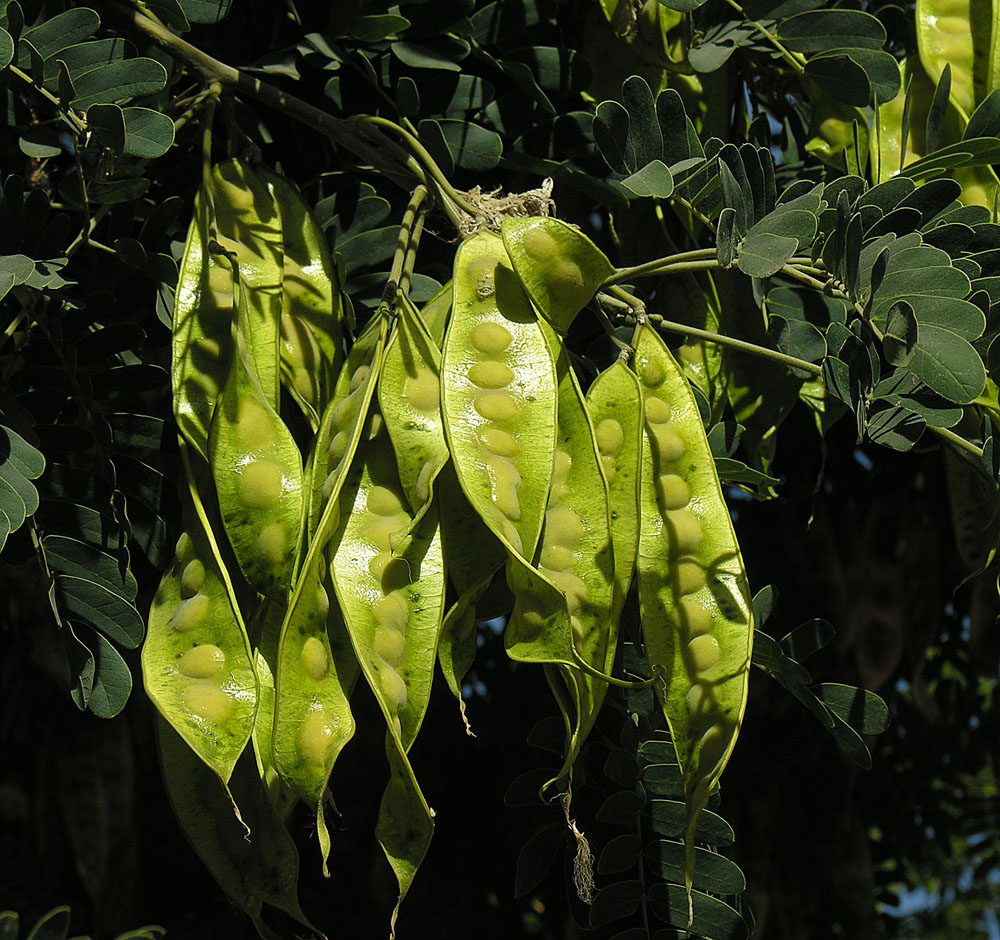
The pods

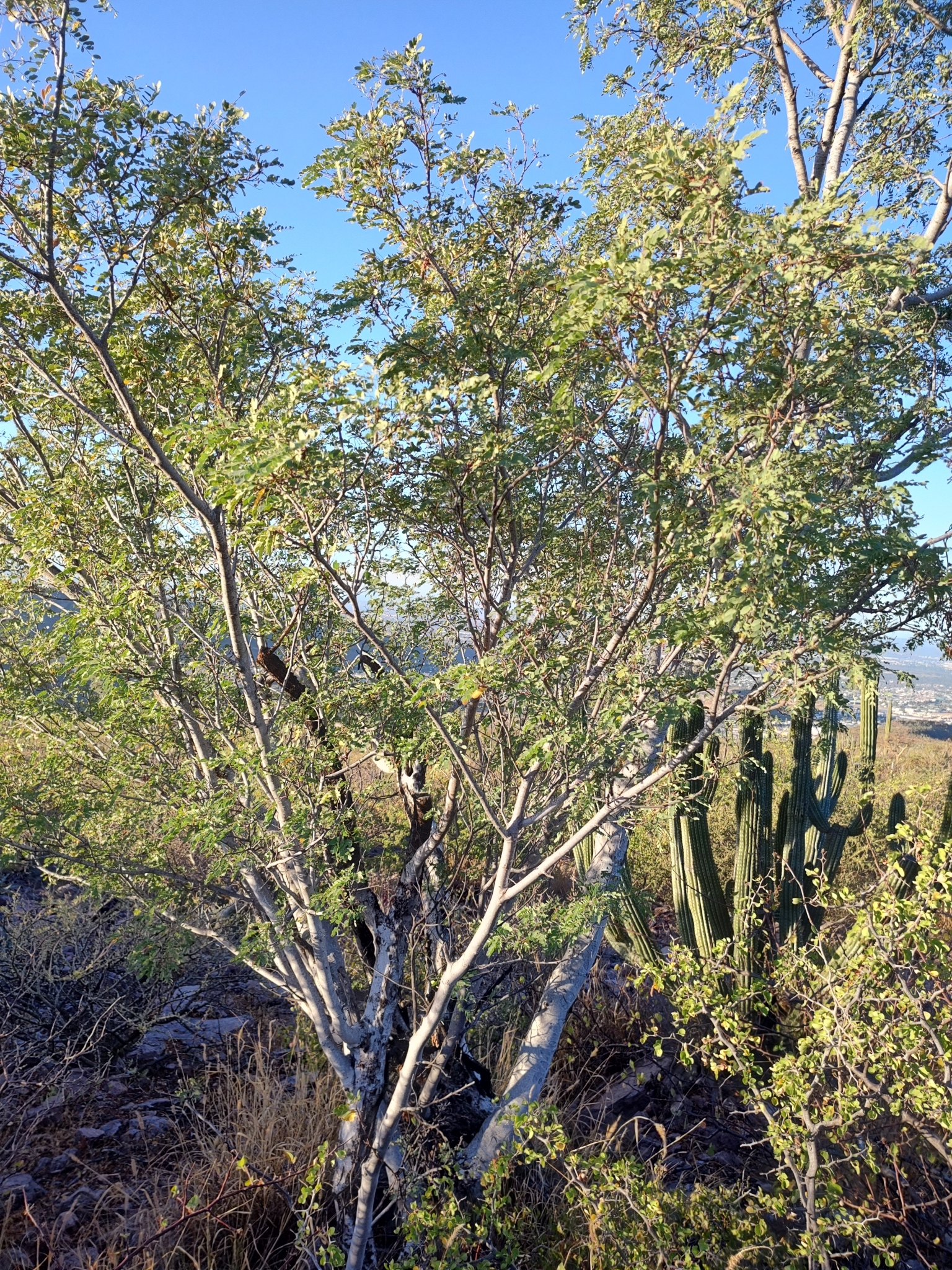
In habitat
