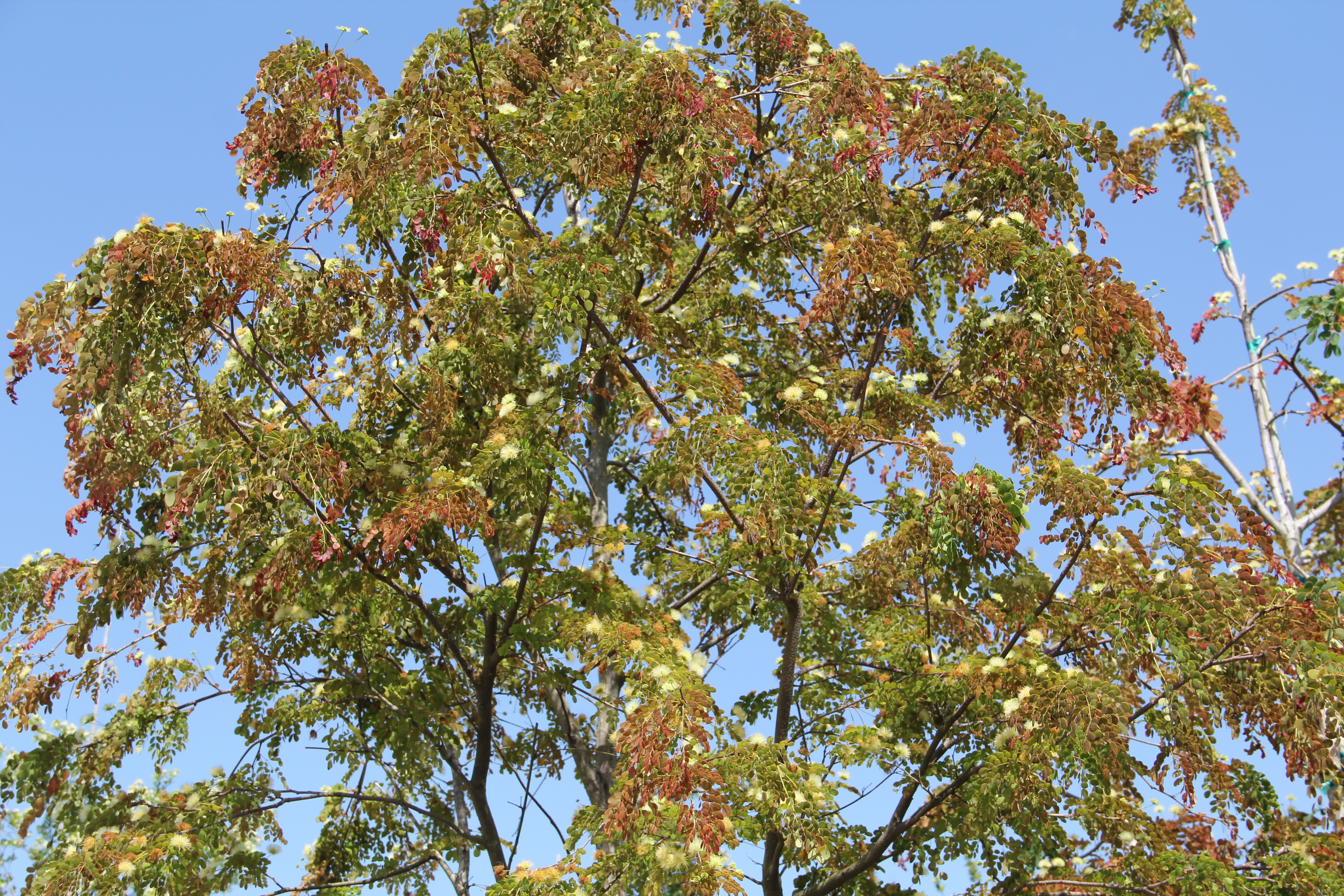
- In bloom in April
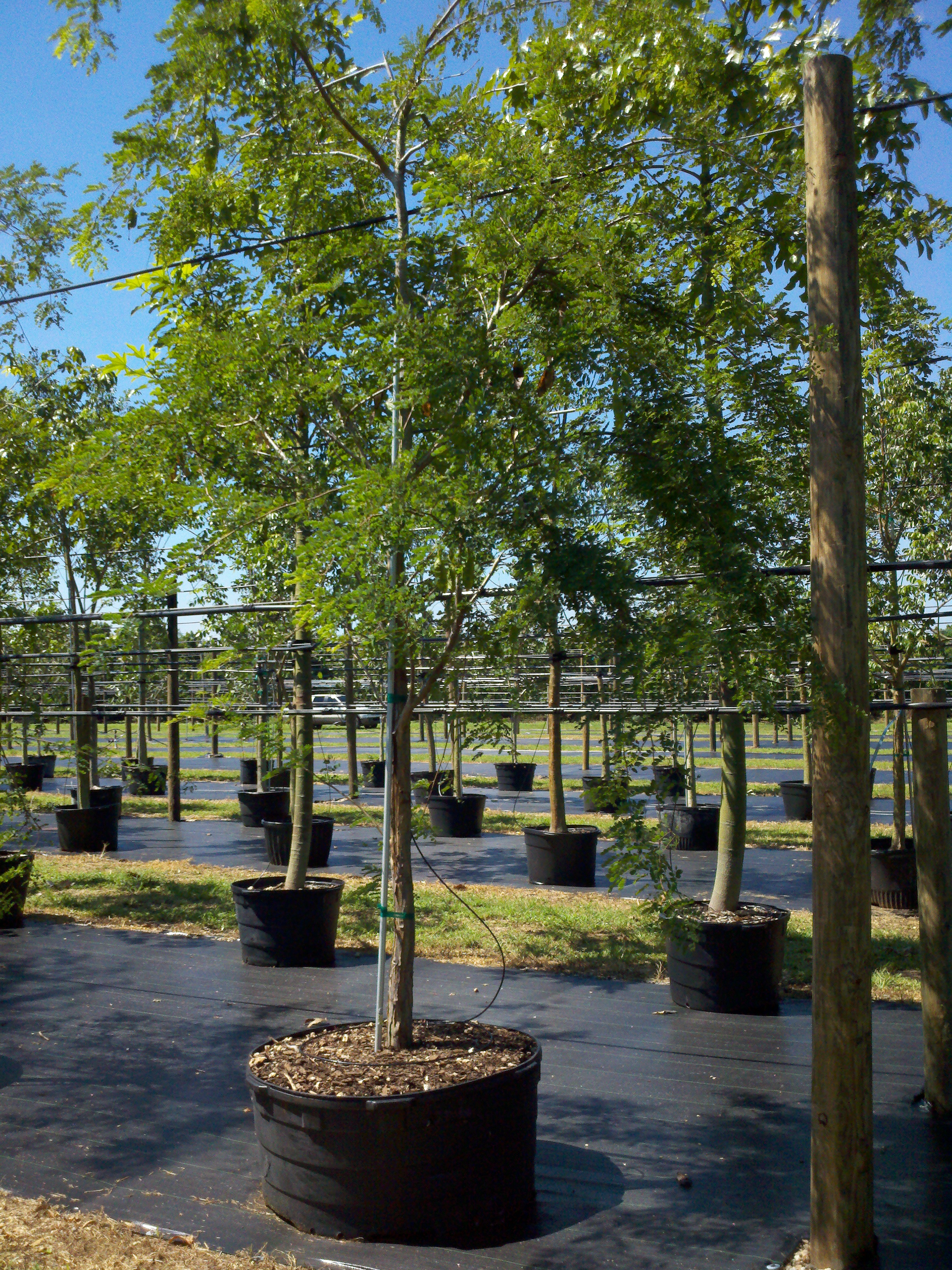
- Cultivated specimens

Conservation status
- Least Concern (IUCN 3.1)

Scientific classification
- Kingdom: Plantae
- Clade: Tracheophytes
- Clade: Angiosperms
- Clade: Eudicots
- Clade: Rosids
- Order: Fabales
- Family: Fabaceae
- Subfamily: Caesalpinioideae
- Clade: Mimosoid clade
- Genus: Lysiloma
- Species: L. sabicu

Binomial name
- Lysiloma sabicu Benth.

Synonyms
- Acacia latisiliqua var. paucifoliola DC.; Leucaena formosa Griseb.; Lysiloma formosum Hitchc.; Lysiloma paucifoliolum (DC.) Hitchc. & Northrop

= Lysiloma sabicu =

Species of plant

Lysiloma sabicu, the sabicu, horseflesh, or horseflesh mahogony, is a species of flowering plant in the family Fabaceae. It is native to the Bahamas, Cuba, and Hispaniola, and it has been introduced to Florida and Puerto Rico. A tree reaching 20 m (66 ft), it is typically found growing on limestone soils, but also on lateritic and serpentine soils, in a variety of forest and shrubland types at elevations from 4 m (10 ft) to 1,100 m (3,600 ft). A source of sabicu wood, it has been assessed as Least Concern.
