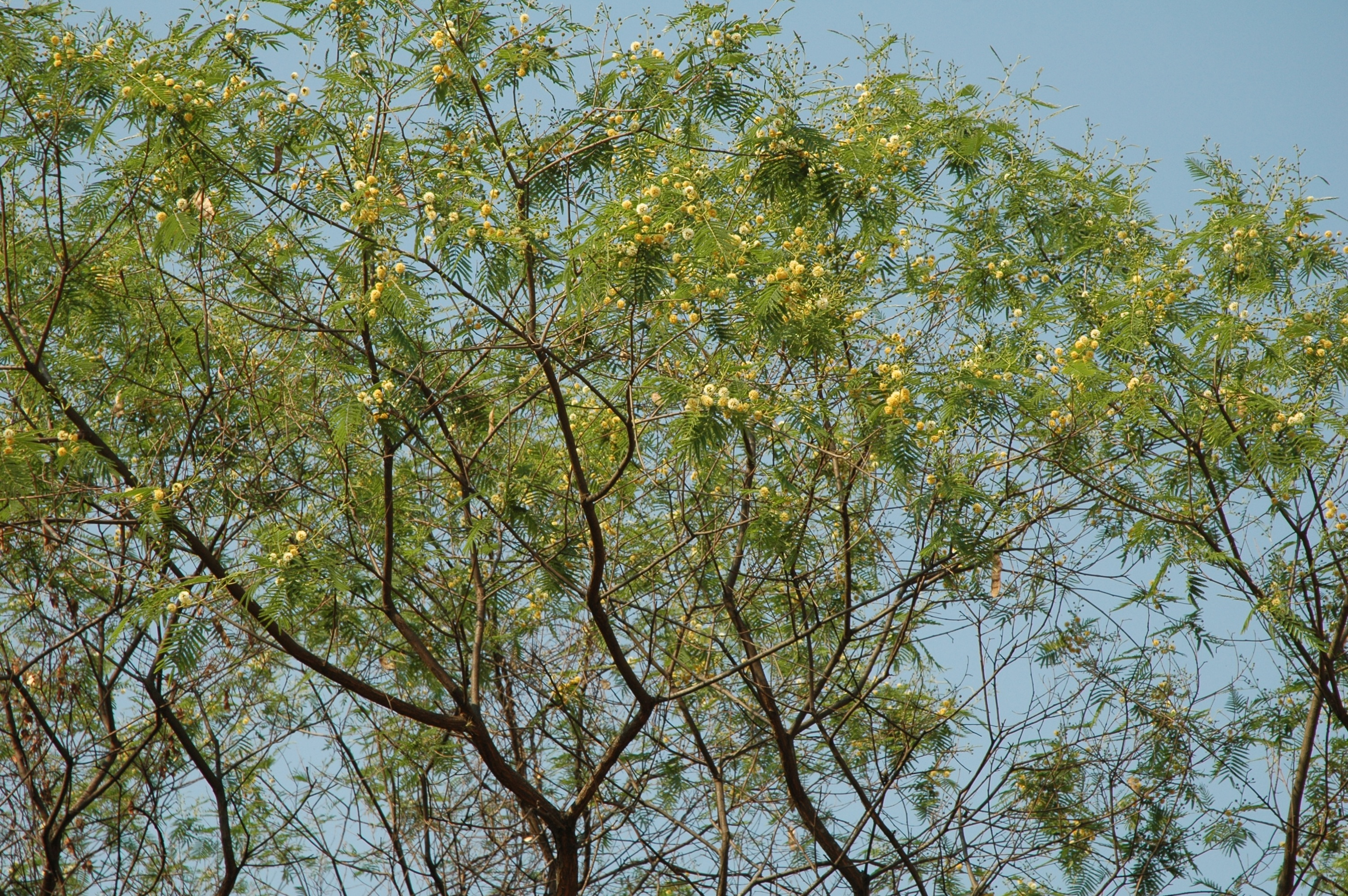

Conservation status
- Least Concern (IUCN 2.3)

Scientific classification
- Kingdom: Plantae
- Clade: Tracheophytes
- Clade: Angiosperms
- Clade: Eudicots
- Clade: Rosids
- Order: Fabales
- Family: Fabaceae
- Subfamily: Caesalpinioideae
- Clade: Mimosoid clade
- Genus: Parasenegalia
- Species: P. visco

Binomial name
- Parasenegalia visco (Lorentz ex Griseb.) Seigler & Ebinger
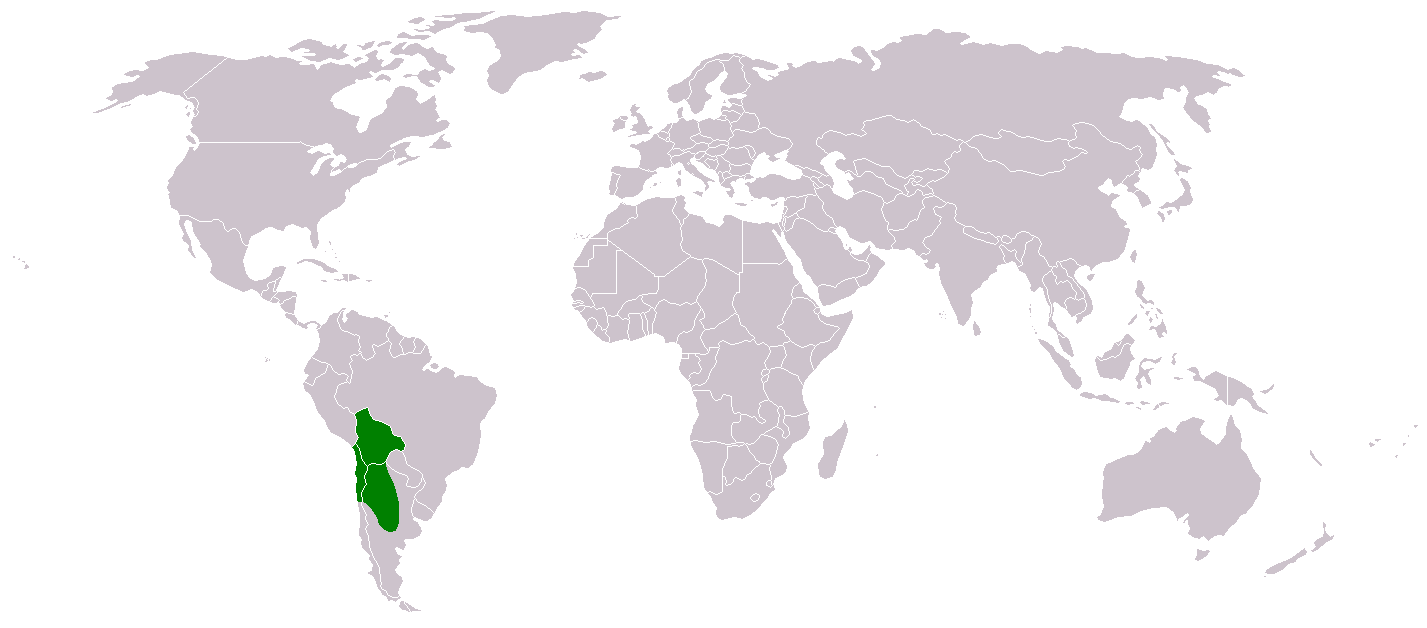
- Range of Parasenegalia visco

Synonyms
- Acacia concinna Phil. 1870; Acacia platensis Manganaro 1919; Acacia polyphylla Clos 1813; Acacia riparia Kunth var. angustifoliola Kuntze 1898; Acacia visco Lorentz ex Griseb. 1879; Acacia visite Lorentz 1874; Lysiloma polyphyllum Benth. 1875; Manganaroa platensis (Manganaro 1919) Speg. 1921; Manganaroa subsericea Speg. 1921 [1923]; Senegalia visco (Lorentz ex Griseb.) Seigler & Ebinger 2006

= Parasenegalia visco =

Species of tree

Parasenegalia visco is a perennial tree found at higher elevations in northern Argentina, Bolivia, Chile and Peru. It has also been introduced to Africa. Common names for it include arca, visco, viscote, viscote blanco and viscote negro. It grows 6–25m tall and it has fragrant yellow flowers in the Spring. In Bolivia is found at an altitude of 1500–3000m. It has light to dark reddish brown twigs and small white flowers. It is cultivated for use in cabinetmaking.
