= Parasenegalia vogeliana =

Conservation status
- Critically Endangered (IUCN 3.1)

Scientific classification
- Kingdom: Plantae
- Clade: Tracheophytes
- Clade: Angiosperms
- Clade: Eudicots
- Clade: Rosids
- Order: Fabales
- Family: Fabaceae
- Subfamily: Caesalpinioideae
- Clade: Mimosoid clade
- Genus: Parasenegalia
- Species: P. vogeliana

Binomial name
- Parasenegalia vogeliana (Steud.) Seigler & Ebinger (2017)

Synonyms
- Acacia ambigua Vogel (1836), nom. illeg.; Acacia vogeliana Steud. (1840); Albizia leonardii Britton & Rose, ex Barneby & J.W.Grimes (1996); Lysiloma ambiguum Urb. (1928), nom. superfl.; Lysiloma vogelianum (Steud.) Stehlé (1946); Senegalia vogeliana (Steud.) Britton & Rose (1928)

Species of legume

Parasenegalia vogeliana is a species of flowering plant in the family Fabaceae. It is a liana native to Hispaniola (Haiti and the Dominican Republic), Puerto Rico, and the Lesser Antilles (Leeward and Windward islands).

As the heterotropic synonym Albizia leonardii, it is rated as Critically Endangered on the IUCN Red List.
