= Rancho El Barril Airstrip =

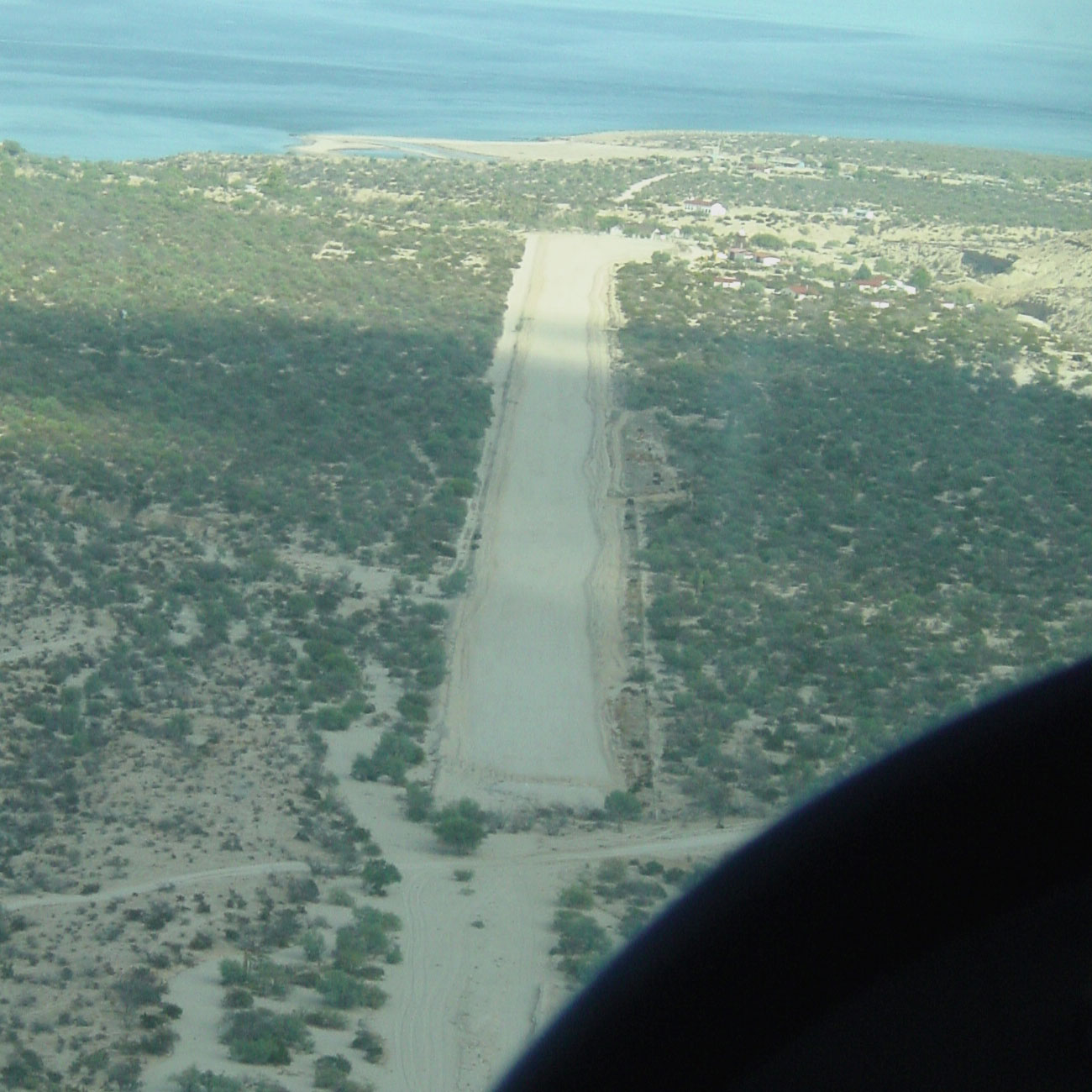
- IATA: none; ICAO: none

Summary
- Airport type: Private
- Operator: Rancho El Barril, S.A. de C.V.
- Location: El Barril
- Elevation AMSL: 125 ft / 38 m
- Coordinates: 28°18′25″N 112°53′11″W
- Interactive map of Rancho El Barril Airstrip

Runways
Direction	Length		Surface
Direction	ft	m	Surface
11/29	4,764	1,452	Soil

Rancho El Barril Airstrip is a private airstrip located 2 miles from El Barril, Municipality of Ensenada, Baja California, Mexico, in Rancho "El Barril", a camp located South of Punta San Francisquito, on the Gulf of California coast. The airstrip is used solely for general aviation purposes. The EBL code is used as identifier.

The runway surface is hard-packed dirt, but it develops numerous pockets of very soft sand after many days without rain, so it is important to carry power and keep moving in order to avoid getting stuck. There are concrete pads at both ends of the strip, but these are badly deteriorated with rebar poking up from the surface. No tall obstacles at either end.
