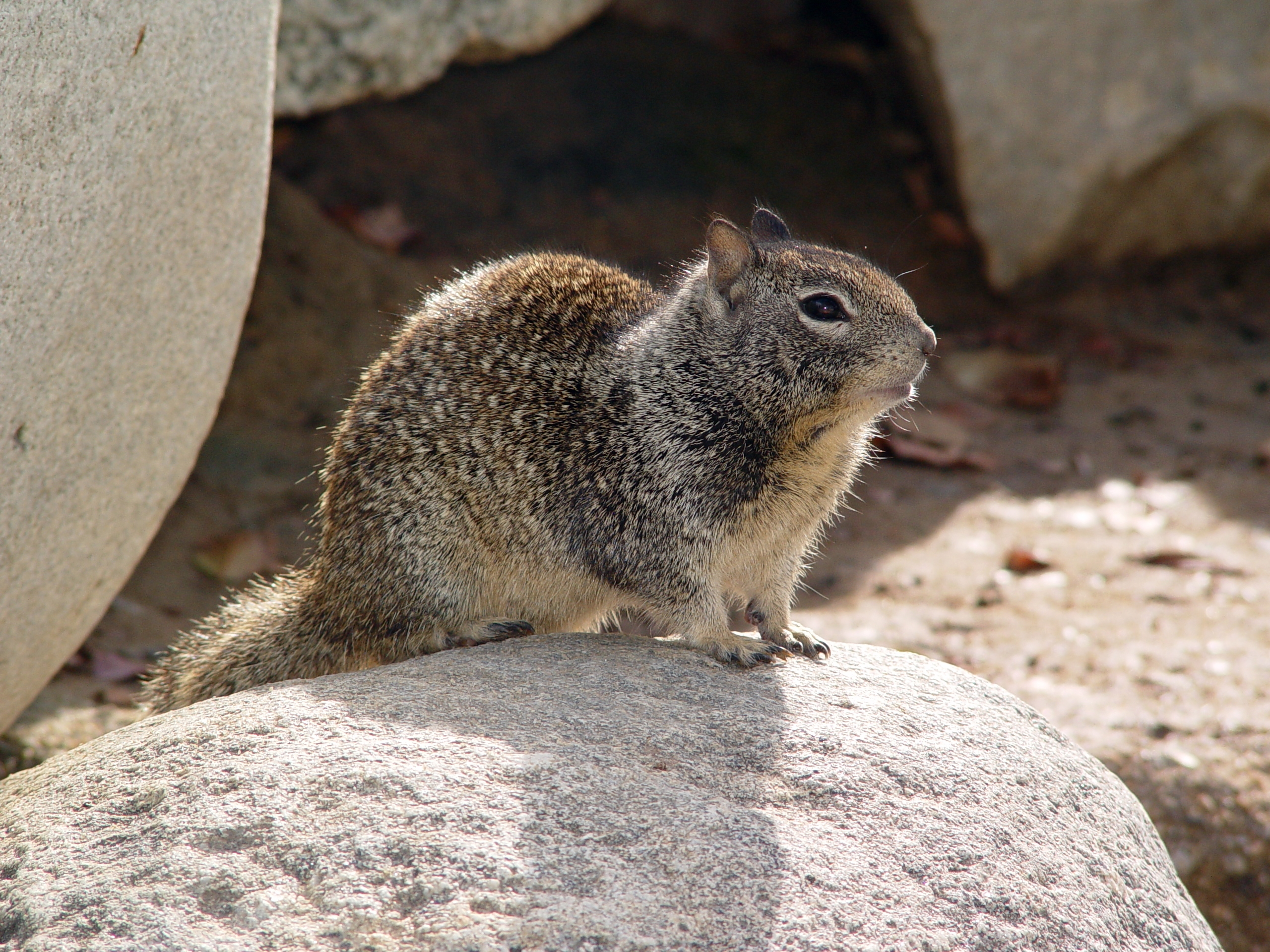

Conservation status
- Least Concern (IUCN 3.1)

Scientific classification
- Kingdom: Animalia
- Phylum: Chordata
- Class: Mammalia
- Order: Rodentia
- Family: Sciuridae
- Genus: Otospermophilus
- Species: O. beecheyi

Binomial name
- Otospermophilus beecheyi (Richardson, 1829)

Synonyms
- Arctomys (Spermophilus) beecheyi Richardson, 1829; Spermophilus beecheyi Citellus beecheyi

= California ground squirrel =

Species of rodent

The California ground squirrel (Otospermophilus beecheyi), also known as the Beechey ground squirrel, is a common and easily observed ground squirrel of the western United States and the Baja California Peninsula. It is common in California with its range spanning through much of the state, as well as northeastern Nevada in areas around Reno and Lake Tahoe.

Formerly placed in Spermophilus, as Spermophilus beecheyi, it was reclassified in Otospermophilus in 2009, as it became clear that Spermophilus as previously defined was not a natural (monophyletic) group.

== Etymology ==
John Richardson, who originally described the species as Arctomys (Spermophilus) beecheyi, or "Beechey's marmot", named it after Frederick William Beechey, an early 19th-century British explorer and naval officer.

== Description ==
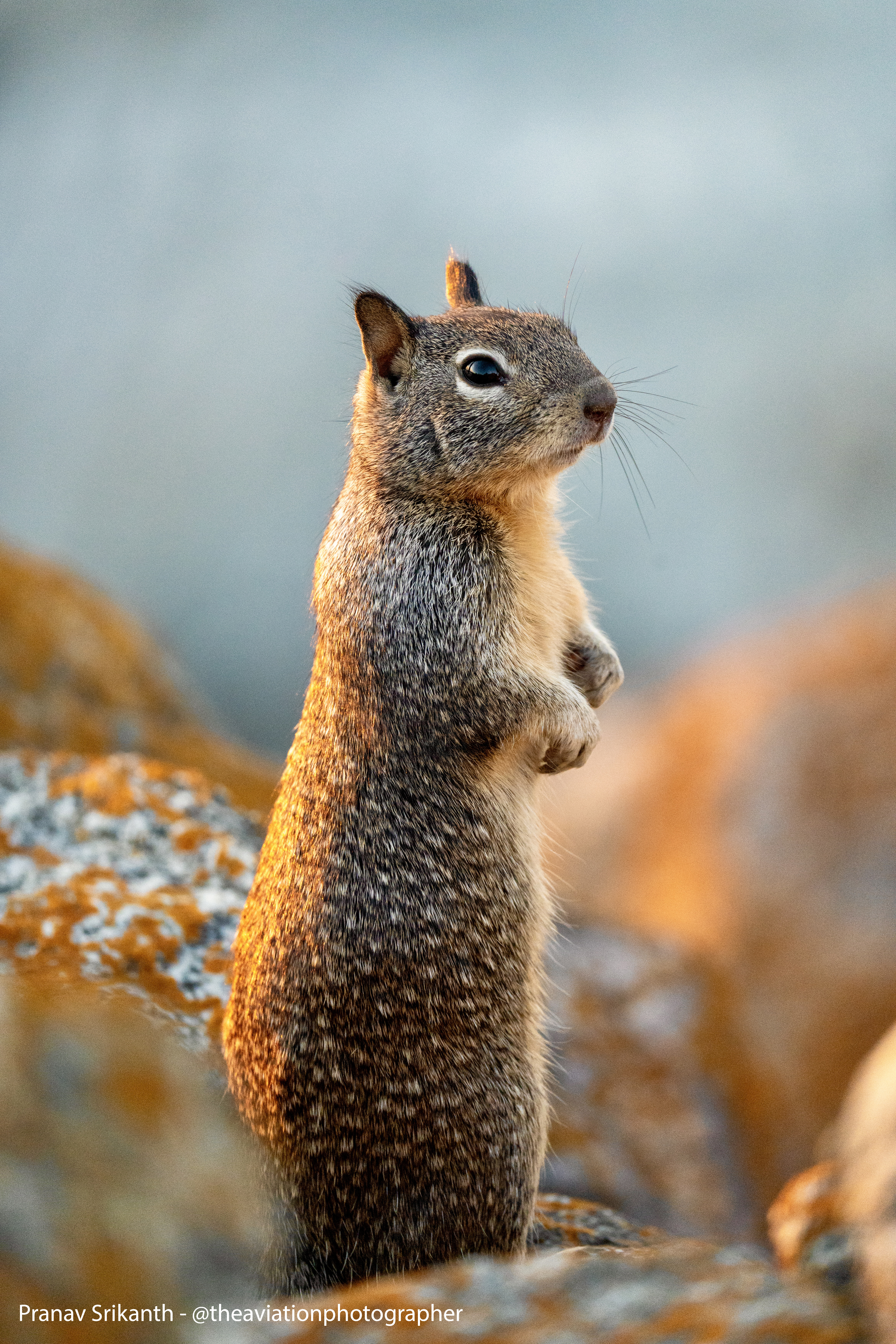
A California Ground Squirrel standing on its hind legs at Pebble Beach, CA.

The squirrel's upper parts are mottled, with the fur containing a mixture of gray, light brown and dusky hairs. The shoulders, neck and sides are a lighter gray. The fur around the eyes is whitish. The underside is lighter, buff or grayish yellow. Head and body are about 30 cm (12 in) long and the tail an additional 15 centimetres (5.9 in). They can weigh from 280 to 738 g (9.9 to 26.0 oz). The tail is relatively bushy for a ground squirrel, and at a quick glance, the squirrel might be mistaken for a fox squirrel.

As is typical for ground squirrels, California ground squirrels live in burrows, which they excavate themselves. Some burrows are occupied communally, but each squirrel has its own entrance. Although they readily become tame in areas used by humans, and quickly learn to take food left or offered by picnickers, they spend most of their time within 25 m (80 ft) of their burrows, and rarely go further than 50 m (160 ft) from it. California Ground Squirrels tend to avoid desert regions, likely due to the harsh conditions and lack of suitable vegetation for food and cover.

In the colder parts of their range, California ground squirrels hibernate for several months, but in areas where winters have no snow, most squirrels are active year-round. In those parts where the summers are hot, they may also estivate for periods of a few days.

California ground squirrels are often regarded as pests in gardens and parks, since they eat ornamental plants and trees. They commonly feed on seeds, such as oats, but also eat insects such as crickets and grasshoppers, as well as various fruits. The dental formula of O. beecheyi is 1.0.2.31.0.1.3 × 2 = 22.

== Life cycle ==
California ground squirrels' mating season is early spring and tends to last only for a few weeks. The species is considered to be promiscuous, so the individuals of one litter can be from multiple mates. The California ground squirrel has one litter of five to eleven per year, with gestation around one month. The young open their eyes at about five weeks and reach sexual maturity around one year old.

The coloration of the young is slightly lighter than the adults, and molting occurs at about eight weeks of age – when the young leave the burrows. California ground squirrels can live up to six years.

== Food and feeding ==
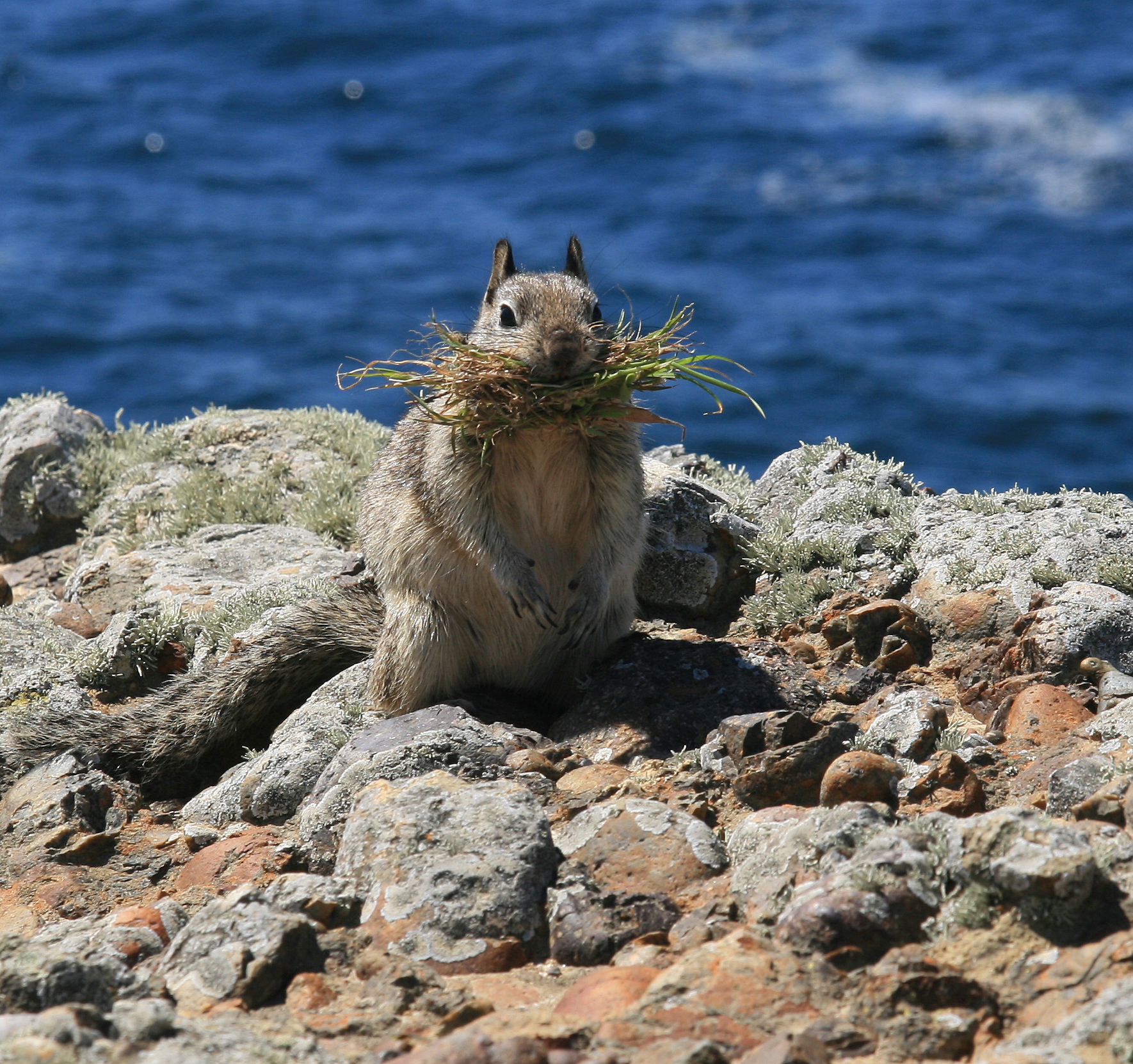
A California ground squirrel at Point Lobos

The California Ground Squirrel is a forager, excelling at locating and eating sparsely dispersed food. They are considered to be mostly herbivorous, with seeds, grains, nuts, fruits, and sometimes roots constituting most of their diet. In a 2024 study, California ground squirrels were observed hunting and eating voles.

They may be seen any time of day, but they prefer to forage for food in the early morning or late afternoon/early evening to avoid the day's heat. Once they locate edible material, California ground squirrels use their cheek pouches for transporting food. They transport the food back to an elaborate burrow system for long term storage, which is also their place for hibernation, sleep, rearing young, and retreating. Burrows are an average of 0.6-0.75 meters in depth and 7.5-8.2 meters in length while entire burrow systems have been recorded to be up to 8.5 meters deep and 226 meters long). Burrow entrances are an average of 10 centimeters wide. During especially hot weather events, the squirrels will enter a type of hibernation, called estivation, in which metabolic rates drop and the entrances to burrow nests are closed to retain moisture. The burrow network has been observed to act as refuges or microhabitats for other species. The burrows are typically excavated in hard-clay earth soils to provide structure and prevent collapse. Colonies house from 2 - 20 ground squirrels, with multiple entrances and exits.

== Predators ==
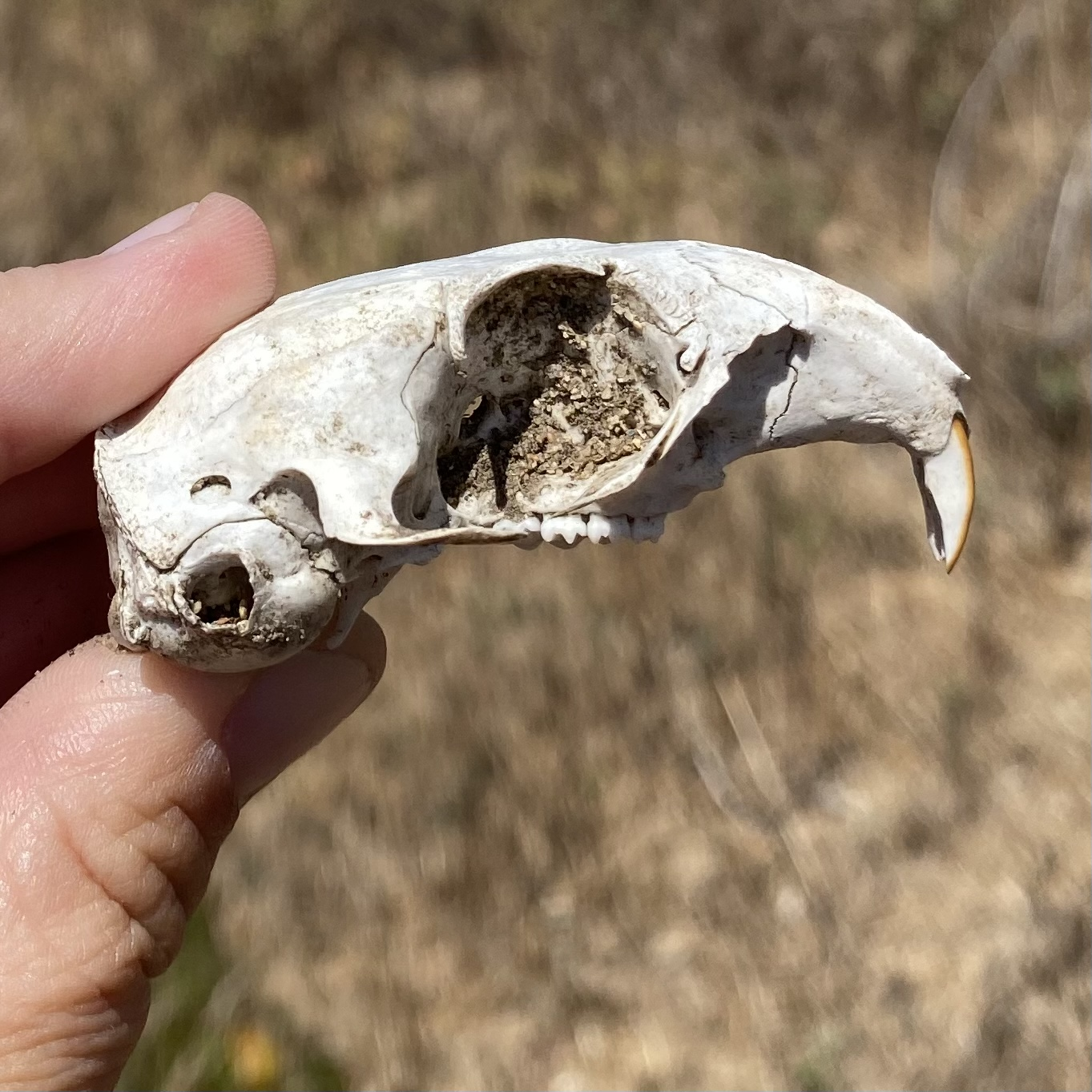
A bleached skull of Otospermophilus beecheyi, found at Ballona Wetlands

California ground squirrels are frequently preyed on by rattlesnakes. They are also preyed on by eagles, raccoons, foxes, badgers, and weasels. Interdisciplinary research at the University of California, Davis, since the 1970s has shown that the squirrels use a variety of techniques to reduce rattlesnake predation. Some populations have varying levels of resistance to rattlesnake venom as adults. Female squirrels with pups also chew on the skins shed by rattlesnakes and then lick themselves and their pups, that are never resistant to venom before one month of age, to disguise their scent. Sand-kicking and other forms of harassment provoke the snake to rattle its tail, which allows a squirrel to assess the size and activity level (dependent on blood temperature) of the snake.

Another strategy is for a squirrel to super-heat and swish around its tail. When hunting, rattlesnakes primarily rely on their pit organ, which detects infrared radiation. The hot tail-swishing appears to convey the message "I am not a threat, but I am too big and swift-moving for it to be worth trying to hunt me." These two confrontational techniques also distract the snake from any nearby squirrel burrows containing pups.

The swishing of the tail from side to side is called tail-waving, which helps the squirrel to deter a snake attack. The snakes attacked the squirrels that exhibited the tail-waving at a shorter distance than those that did not and majority of those tail-waving squirrels successfully dodged these attacks. This successful dodging, along with the fact that the adult squirrels are larger than the young ones, helps to deter the predators, as the rattlesnakes are 1.6 times more likely to be deterred from attacking an area after an encounter with an adult squirrel.

In 30 out of 45 interactions with snakes, the tail-waving behavior of the squirrels stopped the snake in its tracks and the snake attempted to wait for the squirrel to leave before it would consider attacking again, showing that the behavior does deter predatory attacks by the rattlesnakes. This is due to the adult squirrels being vigilant and looking more threatening and also that they are able to more successfully dodge attacks. They also can use their tail-waving to signal to other ground squirrels in the area that a rattlesnake or other predator has recently been spotted. Though the ground squirrels have been found to also exhibit this tail-waving behavior when no predator is present, they wave their tails faster and for a longer time when they spot a predator or in an area where a predator has recently been spotted.

Vigilant behavior in squirrels is also a defense mechanism to avoid predation. In addition to the tail-waving, the squirrels have been found to be more vigilant and on alert if a predator had recently been in the area than they were if no predator had been detected. Acoustic cues for warmer rattlesnakes increases squirrel caution, displaying more activity standing bidalling and tail-waving.If the ground squirrels are aware that they are in an area where the rattlesnakes have recently been, they devote more time to being alert and searching for the predators than to hunting and foraging than in an environment where they do not believe predators exist.

These vigilant squirrels were found to have a faster reaction time to a stimulus from a predator and jump higher and further away than a squirrel that was not as vigilant. In a simulated environment study, 60% of squirrels that were in an environment with a recent snake encounter exhibited an evasive leap behavior, which propels them farther away from their attackers; 20% of squirrels exhibited this behavior in a primary encounter with a snake and roughly 5% of squirrels exhibited this behavior when no snake was present and no threat was detected. This shows that the squirrels are more alert, vigilant, and ready for an attacker after one has been recently seen.
