= List of felids =

Species in mammal family Felidae

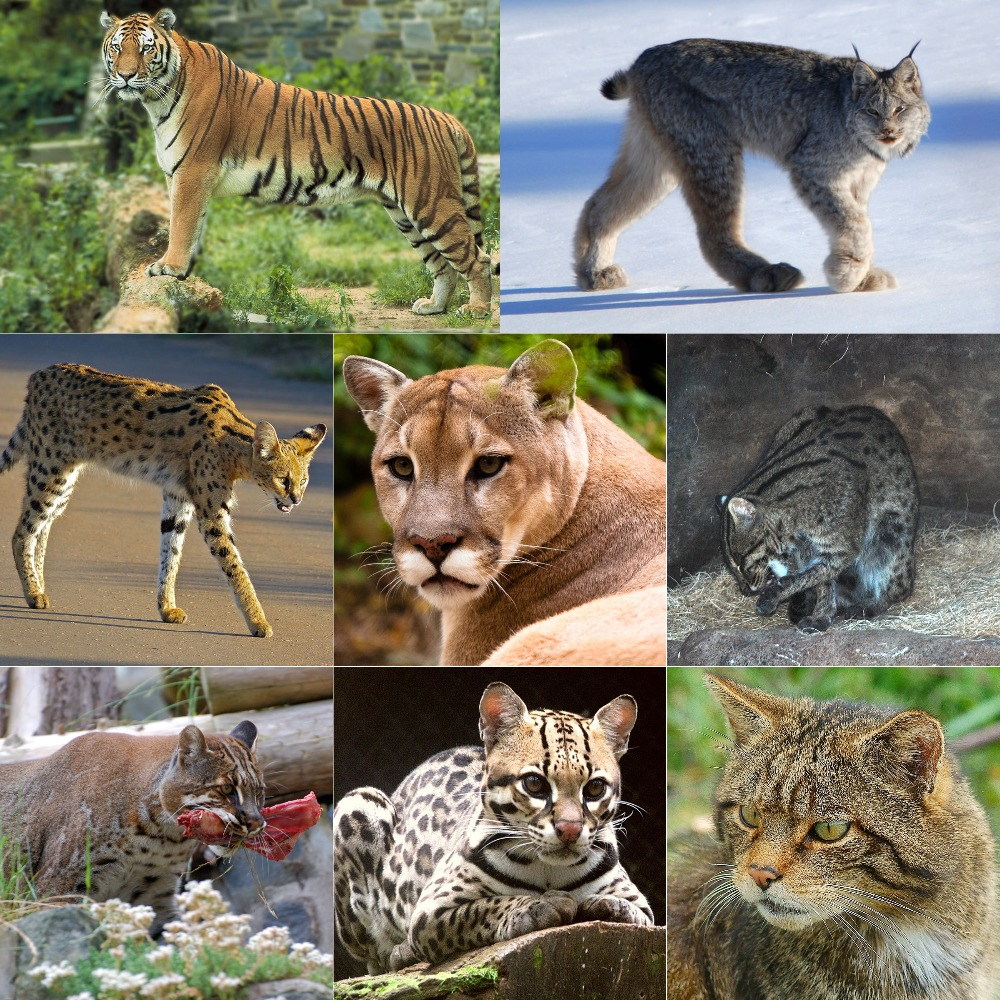
Left to right, top to bottom: tiger (Panthera tigris), Canada lynx (Lynx canadensis), serval (Leptailurus serval), cougar (Puma concolor), fishing cat (Prionailurus viverrinus), Asian golden cat (Catopuma temminckii), ocelot (Leopardus pardalis), and European wildcat (Felis silvestris)

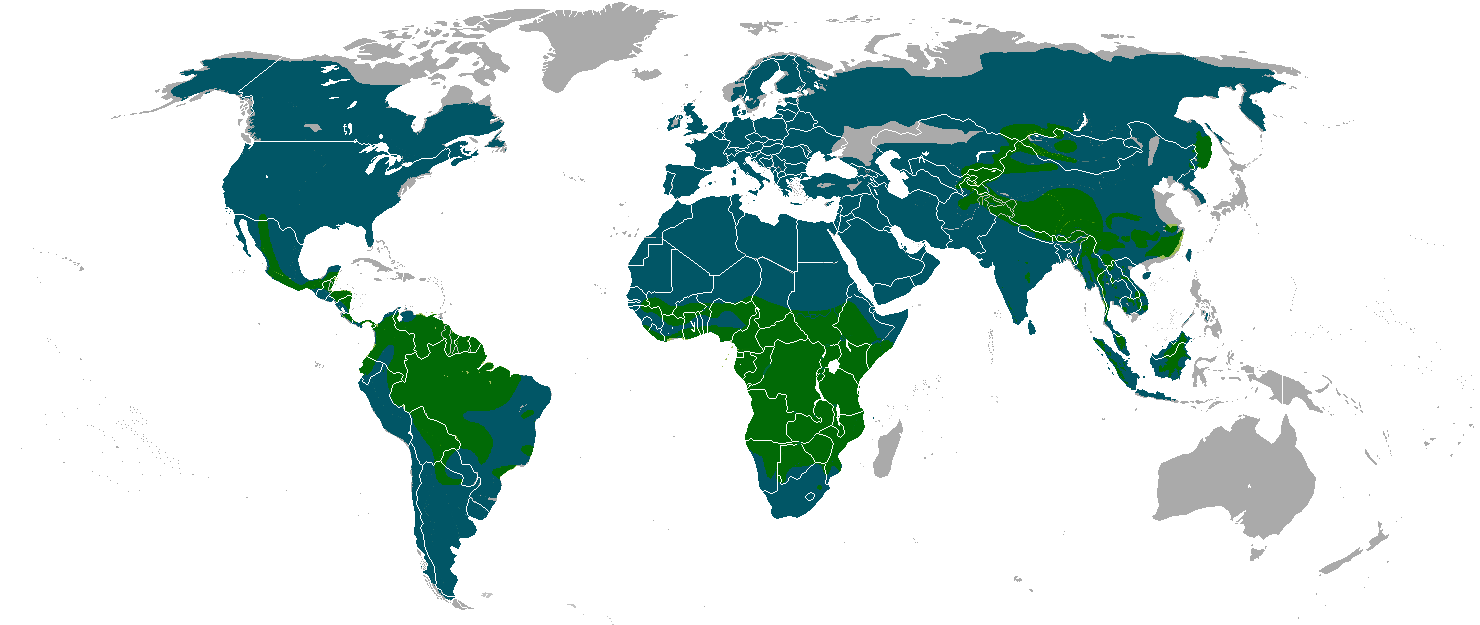
Range of Felidae. Blue is the range of Felinae (excluding the domestic cat), green is the range of Pantherinae.

Felidae is a family of mammals in the order Carnivora, colloquially referred to as cats. A member of this family is called a felid. The term "cat" refers both to felids in general and specifically to domestic cats. The characteristic features of cats have evolved to support a carnivorous lifestyle, with adaptations for ambush or stalking and short pursuit hunting. They have slender muscular bodies, strong flexible forelimbs and retractable claws for holding prey, dental and cranial adaptations for a strong bite, and often have characteristic striped or spotted coat patterns for camouflage.

Felidae comprises two extant subfamilies, the Pantherinae and the Felinae. The former includes the five Panthera species tiger, lion, jaguar, leopard, and snow leopard, as well as the two Neofelis species clouded leopard and Sunda clouded leopard. The subfamily Felinae includes 12 genera and 34 species, such as the bobcat, caracal, cheetah, cougar, ocelot, and common domestic cat.

Traditionally, five subfamilies have been distinguished within the Felidae based on phenotypical features: the Felinae, the Pantherinae, the Acinonychinae (cheetahs), the extinct Machairodontinae, and the extinct Proailurinae. Molecular phylogenetic analysis suggests that living (extant) felids fall into eight lineages (clades). The placement of the cheetah within the Puma lineage invalidates the traditional subfamily Acinonychinae, and recent sources use only two subfamilies for extant genera. The number of accepted species in Felidae has been around 40 since the 18th century, though research, especially modern molecular phylogenetic analysis, has over time adjusted the generally accepted genera as well as the divisions between recognized subspecies, species, and population groups. In addition to the extant species listed here, over 30 fossil genera have been described; these are divided into the subfamilies Felinae, Pantherinae, Proailurinae, and Machairodontinae. This final subfamily includes the genus Smilodon, known as the saber-toothed cat, which went extinct around 10,000 years ago. The earliest known felid genus is Proailurus, part of Proailurinae, which lived approximately 25 million years ago in Eurasia.

== Conventions ==
IUCN Red List categories
Conservation status
- EX: Extinct (0 species)
- EW: Extinct in the wild (0 species)
- CR: Critically endangered (0 species)
- EN: Endangered (4 species)
- VU: Vulnerable (14 species)
- NT: Near threatened (5 species)
- LC: Least concern (16 species)

Other categories
- DD: Data deficient (0 species)
- NE: Not evaluated (2 species)

The author citation for the species or genus is given after the scientific name; parentheses around the author citation indicate that this was not the original taxonomic placement. Conservation status codes listed follow the International Union for Conservation of Nature (IUCN) Red List of Threatened Species. Range maps are provided wherever possible; if a range map is not available, a description of the cat's range is provided. Ranges are based on the IUCN Red List for that species unless otherwise noted. All extinct species or subspecies listed went extinct after 1500 CE, and are indicated by a dagger symbol "†".

== Classification ==
According to the IUCN Cat Specialist Group as of September 2026, the family Felidae consists of 41 extant species belonging to 14 genera and divided into 92 subspecies. This does not include hybrid species (such as the liger) or extinct prehistoric species (such as Smilodon). Modern molecular studies indicate that the 14 genera can be grouped into 8 lineages.

Subfamily Felinae: small and medium-sized cats

- Bay cat lineage
  - Genus Catopuma: two species
  - Genus Pardofelis: one species
- Caracal lineage
  - Genus Caracal: two species
  - Genus Leptailurus: one species
- Ocelot lineage
  - Genus Leopardus: eight species
- Lynx lineage
  - Genus Lynx: four species
- Puma lineage
  - Genus Acinonyx: one species
  - Genus Herpailurus: one species
  - Genus Puma: one species
- Leopard cat lineage
  - Genus Otocolobus: one species
  - Genus Prionailurus: five species
- Domestic cat lineage
  - Genus Felis: seven species

Subfamily Pantherinae: large cats

- Panthera lineage
  - Genus Neofelis: two species
  - Genus Panthera: five species

- Felidae
  Panthera lineage
  - Pantherinae
    - Panthera
    - Neofelis
  - Felinae
    Bay cat lineage
    - - Catopuma
      - Pardofelis
    - Caracal lineage
      - - Caracal
        - Leptailurus
      - Ocelot lineage
        - Leopardus
        - Lynx lineage
          - Lynx
          - Puma lineage
            - - - Puma
                - Herpailurus
              - Acinonyx
            - Leopard cat lineage
              - - Prionailurus
                - Otocolobus
              - Felis

== Felids ==
The following classification is based on the most recent proposals, as codified by the Cat Specialist Group of the IUCN.

=== Subfamily Felinae ===
==== Bay cat lineage ====
Genus Catopuma – Severtzov, 1858 – two species
Common name	Scientific name and subspecies	Range	Size and ecology	IUCN status and estimated population (Note: Population figures rounded to the nearest hundred. Population trends as described by the International Union for Conservation of Nature.)
Asian golden cat	C. temminckii (Vigors & Horsfield, 1827) Two subspecies: C. t. moormensis; C. t. temminckii	Scattered areas of Southeast Asia	Size: 71–105 cm (28–41 in) long, 40–56 cm (16–22 in) tail Habitat: Forest, savanna, grassland, and shrubland Diet: Mostly unknown, with evidence of rodents and snakes	VU 1,000-12,000
Bay cat	C. badia (Gray, 1874)	The island of Borneo	Size: 53–67 cm (21–26 in) long, 32–40 cm (13–16 in) tail Habitat: Forest Diet: Unknown	EN 2,200

Genus Pardofelis – Severtzov, 1858 – one species
Common name	Scientific name and subspecies	Range	Size and ecology	IUCN status and estimated population
Marbled cat	P. marmorata (Martin, 1836) Two subspecies: P. m. longicaudata; P. m. marmorata	Parts of Southeast Asia	Size: 45–62 cm (18–24 in) long, 36–55 cm (14–22 in) tail Habitat: Forest Diet: Likely rodents, squirrels, and birds	NT Unknown

==== Caracal lineage ====
Genus Caracal – Gray, 1843 – two species
Common name	Scientific name and subspecies	Range	Size and ecology	IUCN status and estimated population
African golden cat	C. aurata (Temminck, 1827) Two subspecies: C. a. aurata; C. a. celidogaster	Central and western Africa	Size: 65–90 cm (26–35 in) long, 28–35 cm (11–14 in) tail Habitat: Forest Diet: Rodents and squirrels, along with antelope and primates	VU Unknown
Caracal	C. caracal (Schreber, 1776) Three subspecies: C. c. caracals (Southern caracal); C. c. nubicus (Northern caracal); C. c. schmitzi (Asiatic caracal)	Most of non-Saharan Africa, Middle East, and southern Asia	Size: 80–100 cm (31–39 in) long, 20–34 cm (8–13 in) tail Habitat: Forest, desert, grassland, shrubland, and savanna Diet: Rodents, as well as antelope, birds, reptiles, and fish	LC Unknown

Genus Leptailurus – Severtzov, 1858 – one species
Common name	Scientific name and subspecies	Range	Size and ecology	IUCN status and estimated population
Serval	L. serval (Schreber, 1776) Three subspecies: L. s. constantina; L. s. lipostictus; L. s. serval	Sub-Saharan Africa	Size: 59–100 cm (23–39 in) long, 20–38 cm (8–15 in) tail Habitat: Grassland, inland wetlands, forest, and savanna Diet: Small mammals and rodents, as well as birds, reptiles, and arthropods	LC Unknown

==== Ocelot lineage ====
Genus Leopardus – Gray, 1842 – eight species
Common name	Scientific name and subspecies	Range	Size and ecology	IUCN status and estimated population
Andean mountain cat	L. jacobita (Cornalia, 1865)	Andes mountains	Size: 57–65 cm (22–26 in) long, 41–48 cm (16–19 in) tail Habitat: Rocky areas, shrubland, and grassland Diet: Rodents, as well as other small mammals	EN 2,200
Geoffroy's cat	L. geoffroyi (d'Orbigny & Gervais, 1844)	Southern and central South America	Size: 43–88 cm (17–35 in) long, 23–40 cm (9–16 in) tail Habitat: Savanna, forest, shrubland, and grassland Diet: Small rodents, birds, and rabbits	LC Unknown
Kodkod	L. guigna (Molina, 1782) Two subspecies: L. g. guigna; L. g. tigrillo	Central and southern Chile	Size: 37–56 cm (15–22 in) long, 20–25 cm (8–10 in) tail Habitat: Shrubland and forest Diet: Small mammals, especially rodents, and also small marsupials, birds, reptiles, and carrion	LC 26,400–101,300
Margay	L. wiedii (Schinz, 1821) Three subspecies: L. w. glauculus; L. w. vigens; L. w. wiedii	Mexico, Central America, and South America	Size: 46–69 cm (18–27 in) long, 23–52 cm (9–20 in) tail Habitat: Forest, shrubland, and savanna Diet: Small mammals, as well as lizards and birds	NT Unknown
Ocelot	L. pardalis (Linnaeus, 1758) Two subspecies: L. p. mitis; L. p. pardalis	Southern North America, Central America, and South America	Size: 50–102 cm (20–40 in) long, 30–50 cm (12–20 in) tail Habitat: Forest, shrubland, and savanna Diet: Small and medium mammals, birds and reptiles	LC Unknown
Oncilla	L. tigrinus (Schreber, 1775) Three subspecies: L. t. oncilla; L. t. pardinoides; L. t. tigrinus	Most of South America	Size: 38–59 cm (15–23 in) long, 20–42 cm (8–17 in) tail Habitat: Forest and shrubland Diet: Small mammals, birds and reptiles	VU 9,000–10,000
Pampas cat	L. colocola (Molina, 1782) Seven subspecies: L. c. braccatus; L. c. budini; L. c. colocola; L. c. garleppi; L. c. munoai; L. c. pajeros; L. c. wolffsohn	Western, central, and southern South America	Size: 42–79 cm (17–31 in) long, 22–33 cm (9–13 in) tail Habitat: Forest, savanna, shrubland, grassland, and desert Diet: Small mammals and ground-dwelling birds	NT Unknown
Southern tigrina	L. guttulus (Hensel, 1872)	Southeastern South America	Size: 38–59 cm (15–23 in) long, 20–42 cm (8–17 in) tail Habitat: Forest and savanna Diet: Small mammals, birds and lizards	VU 6,000

==== Lynx lineage ====
Genus Lynx – Kerr, 1792 – four species
Common name	Scientific name and subspecies	Range	Size and ecology	IUCN status and estimated population
Bobcat	L. rufus (Schreber, 1777) Two subspecies: L. r. fasciatus; L. r. rufus	Most of the United States and parts of Canada and Mexico	Size: 50–120 cm (20–47 in) long, 9–25 cm (4–10 in) tail Habitat: Desert, shrubland, savanna, forest, and grassland Diet: Rabbits, along with rodents and small or medium-sized mammals	LC Unknown
Canada lynx	L. canadensis Kerr, 1792	Canada, Alaska, and parts of northern United States	Size: 73–106 cm (29–42 in) long, 10–15 cm (4–6 in) tail Habitat: Forest, shrubland, and grassland Diet: Almost exclusively hares, especially snowshoe hares	LC Unknown
Eurasian lynx	L. lynx (Linnaeus, 1758) Six subspecies: L. l. balcanicus (Balkan lynx); L. l. carpathicus (Carpathian lynx); L. l. dinniki (Caucasian lynx); L. l. isabellinus (Turkestan lynx); L. l. lynx (Northern lynx); L. l. wrangeli (Siberian lynx)	Eastern Europe, Russia, and parts of China	Size: 90–120 cm (35–47 in) long, 19–23 cm (7–9 in) tail Habitat: Forest, shrubland, desert, rocky areas, and grassland Diet: Deer, as well as other small or medium-sized mammals and birds	LC Unknown
Iberian lynx	L. pardinus (Temminck, 1827)	Scattered pockets of southern Spain	Size: 65–92 cm (26–36 in) long, 11–16 cm (4–6 in) tail Habitat: Shrubland Diet: Almost exclusively European rabbit	VU 650

==== Puma lineage ====
Genus Acinonyx – Brookes, 1828 – one species
Common name	Scientific name and subspecies	Range	Size and ecology	IUCN status and estimated population
Cheetah	A. jubatus (Schreber, 1775) Four subspecies: A. j. hecki (Northwest African cheetah); A. j. jubatus (Southeast African cheetah); A. j. soemmeringii (Northeast African cheetah); A. j. venaticus (Asiatic cheetah)	Southern, eastern, and central Africa; Iran	Size: 113–140 cm (44–55 in) long, 60–84 cm (24–33 in) tail Habitat: Desert, grassland, savanna, and shrubland Diet: Antelopes and gazelles	VU 6,500

Genus Herpailurus – Saint-Hilaire, 1803 – one species
Common name	Scientific name and subspecies	Range	Size and ecology	IUCN status and estimated population
Jaguarundi	H. yagouaroundi (Saint-Hilaire, 1803)	Most of South and Central America	Size: 49–78 cm (19–31 in) long, 28–59 cm (11–23 in) tail Habitat: Grassland, shrubland, savanna, and forest Diet: Small mammals, birds and reptiles	NT 13,400

Genus Puma – Jardine, 1834 – one species
Common name	Scientific name and subspecies	Range	Size and ecology	IUCN status and estimated population
Cougar	P. concolor (Linnaeus, 1771) Two subspecies: P. c. concolor (South American cougar); P. c. couguar (North American cougar)	South America and North America	Size: 100–150 cm (39–59 in) long, 60–90 cm (24–35 in) tail Habitat: Forest, desert, grassland, savanna, and shrubland Diet: Deer, as well as smaller mammals such as feral pigs, raccoons and armadillos	LC Unknown

==== Leopard cat lineage ====
Genus Otocolobus – Brandt, 1841 – one species
Common name	Scientific name and subspecies	Range	Size and ecology	IUCN status and estimated population
Pallas's cat	O. manul (Pallas, 1776) Two subspecies: O. m. manul; O. m. nigripectus	Central Asia	Size: 46–65 cm (18–26 in) long, 21–31 cm (8–12 in) tail Habitat: Rocky areas, grassland, shrubland, and desert Diet: Small mammals, especially pikas, as well as rodents and birds	LC 58,000

Genus Prionailurus – Severtzov, 1858 – five species
Common name	Scientific name and subspecies	Range	Size and ecology	IUCN status and estimated population
Fishing cat	P. viverrinus (Bennett, 1833) Two subspecies: P. v. viverrinus; P. v. rhizophoreus	South and Southeast Asia	Size: 65–85 cm (26–33 in) long, 25–30 cm (10–12 in) tail Habitat: Inland wetlands, shrubland, grassland, and forest Diet: Rodents, birds and fish	VU Unknown
Flat-headed cat	P. planiceps (Vigors & Horsfield, 1827)	The Thai-Malay Peninsula, Borneo, and Sumatra	Size: 45–52 cm (18–20 in) long, 13–17 cm (5–7 in) tail Habitat: Inland wetlands and forest Diet: Fish, as well as birds and small rodents	EN 2,500
Leopard cat	P. bengalensis (Kerr, 1792) Two subspecies: P. b. bengalensis; P. b. euptilura	Eastern Asia	Size: 45–65 cm (18–26 in) long, 20–30 cm (8–12 in) tail Habitat: Grassland, inland wetlands, shrubland, and forest Diet: Rodents, particularly murids, as well as other small mammals, eels, and fish	LC Unknown
Rusty-spotted cat	P. rubiginosus (Saint-Hilaire, 1834) Three subspecies: P. r. koladivius; P. r. phillipsi; P. r. rubiginosus	India, Sri Lanka, and Nepal	Size: 35–48 cm (14–19 in) long, 20–25 cm (8–10 in) tail Habitat: Desert, savanna, grassland, shrubland, and forest Diet: Rodents	NT Unknown
Sunda leopard cat	P. javanensis (Desmarest, 1816) Two subspecies: P. j. javanensis; P. j. sumatranus	Sundaland islands of Java, Bali, Borneo, Sumatra, and the Philippines	Size: 45–65 cm (18–26 in) long, 20–30 cm (8–12 in) tail Habitat: Forest Diet: Rodents, as well as amphibians, lizards, and birds	NE Unknown

==== Domestic cat lineage ====
Genus Felis – Linnaeus, 1758 – seven species
Common name	Scientific name and subspecies	Range	Size and ecology	IUCN status and estimated population
African wildcat	F. lybica Forster, 1780 Three subspecies: F. l. cafra (Southern African wildcat); F. l. lybica; F. l. ornata (Asiatic wildcat)	Africa, West and Central Asia, northern India, and western China	Size: 45–80 cm (18–31 in) long, 30 cm (12 in) tail Habitat: Forest, desert, shrubland, savanna, and grassland Diet: Rodents and rabbits, and to a lesser extent birds and other small animals	LC Unknown
Black-footed cat	F. nigripes Burchell, 1824	Southern Africa	Size: 37–52 cm (15–20 in) long, 14–20 cm (6–8 in) tail Habitat: Savanna, grassland, and desert Diet: Small mammals and birds	VU 6,200
Chinese mountain cat	F. bieti Milne-Edwards, 1892	Northwest China	Size: 60–85 cm (24–33 in) long, 29–35 cm (11–14 in) tail Habitat: Grassland and forest Diet: Unknown	VU 1,200–23,500
Domestic cat	F. catus Linnaeus, 1758	Worldwide	Size: 46 cm (18 in) long, 30 cm (12 in) tail Habitat: Domesticated; feral cats have a cosmopolitan distribution in forests, grasslands, tundra, coastal areas, agricultural land, scrublands, urban areas, and wetlands Diet: Birds and small mammals in the wild	NE Over 500 million
European wildcat	F. silvestris Schreber, 1777 Two subspecies: F. s. silvestris; F. s. caucasica (Caucasian wildcat)	Spain, Scotland, the Balkans, and Central Europe	Size: 45–80 cm (18–31 in) long, 30 cm (12 in) tail Habitat: Shrubland and forest Diet: Rodents and rabbits, and to a lesser extent birds	LC Unknown
Jungle cat	F. chaus Schreber, 1777 Three subspecies: F. c. affinis; F. c. chaus; F. c. fulvidina	India and parts of the Middle East and Southeast Asia	Size: 58–76 cm (23–30 in) long, 21–27 cm (8–11 in) tail Habitat: Forest, inland wetlands, desert, grassland, shrubland, and savanna Diet: Small mammals and rodents, as well as birds and other small animals	LC Unknown
Sand cat	F. margarita Loche, 1858 Two subspecies: F. m. margarita; F. m. thinobia	Scattered areas in Western Africa, Saudi Arabia, and near the Caspian Sea	Size: 39–52 cm (15–20 in) long, 22–31 cm (9–12 in) tail Habitat: Desert Diet: Small rodents, as well as small birds and lizards	LC Unknown

=== Subfamily Pantherinae ===
==== Panthera lineage ====
Genus Neofelis – Gray, 1867 – two species
Common name	Scientific name and subspecies	Range	Size and ecology	IUCN status and estimated population
Clouded leopard	N. nebulosa (Griffith, 1821)	Scattered Southeast Asia and southern China (current in red, historical range in green)	Size: 69–108 cm (27–43 in) long, 61–91 cm (24–36 in) tail Habitat: Forest and shrubland Diet: Medium-sized and small mammals on the ground and in trees, as well as birds	VU 3,700-5,600
Sunda clouded leopard	N. diardi Cuvier, 1823 Two subspecies: N. d. borneensis (Bornean clouded leopard); N. d. diardi (Sumatran clouded leopard)	Parts of Sumatra and Borneo	Size: 69–108 cm (27–43 in) long, 61–91 cm (24–36 in) tail Habitat: Forest Diet: Medium-sized and small mammals	VU 4,500

Genus Panthera – Oken, 1816 – five species
Common name	Scientific name and subspecies	Range	Size and ecology	IUCN status and estimated population
Jaguar	P. onca (Linnaeus, 1758)	Large swathes of South and Latin America, and Arizona in the United States	Size: 110–170 cm (43–67 in) long, 44–80 cm (17–31 in) tail Habitat: Forest, shrubland, inland wetlands, savanna, and grassland Diet: Variety of mammals, reptiles and birds, preferring ungulates	NT Unknown
Leopard	P. pardus (Linnaeus, 1758) Eight subspecies: P. p. delacouri (Indochinese leopard); P. p. fusca (Indian leopard); P. p. kotiya (Sri Lankan leopard); P. p. melas (Javan leopard); P. p. nimr (Arabian leopard); P. p. orientalis (Amur leopard); P. p. pardus (African leopard); P. p. tulliana (Persian leopard / Anatolian leopard)	Much of Sub-Saharan Africa, the Middle East, the Indian subcontinent, the Caucasus in Europe, Southeast Asia, and Siberia	Size: 91–191 cm (36–75 in) long, 51–101 cm (20–40 in) tail Habitat: Forest, desert, rocky areas, grassland, savanna, and shrubland Diet: Ungulates, as well as other mammals, insects, reptiles, and birds	VU 146,800–261,600
Lion	P. leo (Linnaeus, 1758) Two subspecies: P. l. leo; P. l. melanochaita	Sub-Saharan Africa and India	Size: 137–250 cm (54–98 in) long, 60–100 cm (24–39 in) tail Habitat: Forest, grassland, shrubland, savanna, and desert Diet: Ungulates such as antelopes, zebra, and wildebeest, as well as other small to large mammals	VU 22,000–25,000
Snow leopard	P. uncia (Schreber, 1775)	Himalayas reaching north to Mongolia	Size: 90–120 cm (35–47 in) long, 80–100 cm (31–39 in) tail Habitat: Shrubland, rocky areas, forest, and grassland Diet: Caprids such as sheep and goats, as well as small mammals and birds	VU 2,700–3,400
Tiger	P. tigris (Linnaeus, 1758) Two subspecies: P. t. sondaica (Sunda Island tiger); P. t. tigris (Mainland Asian tiger)	Scattered sections of Southeast Asia, Indian subcontinent, and Siberia	Size: 150–230 cm (59–91 in) long, 90–110 cm (35–43 in) tail Habitat: Shrubland, forest, and grassland Diet: Deer and wild pigs, as well as a wide variety of other animals	EN 2,600–3,900

== See also ==
- List of individual cats
