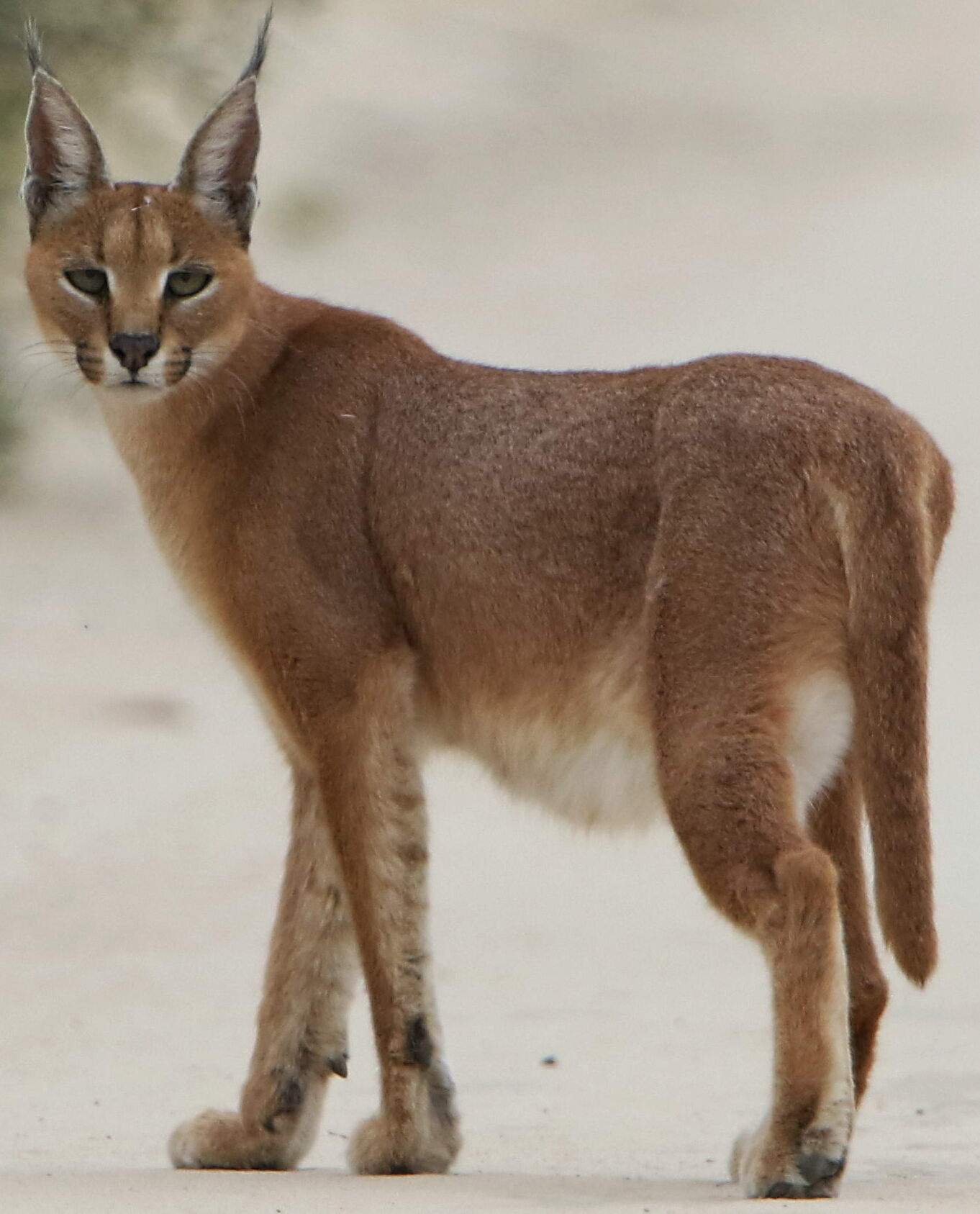
- Caracal in Kgalagadi Transfrontier Park

Conservation status
- Least Concern (IUCN 3.1)
- CITES Appendix I (Note: Only populations of Asia. All other populations are included in Appendix II.)

Scientific classification
- Kingdom: Animalia
- Phylum: Chordata
- Class: Mammalia
- Order: Carnivora
- Family: Felidae
- Genus: Caracal
- Species: C. caracal

Binomial name
- Caracal caracal (Schreber, 1776)

Subspecies
- See text
- Distribution of caracal, 2016

Synonyms
- List: C. bengalensis (J. B. Fischer, 1829); C. melanotis Gray, 1843; C. melanotix Gray, 1843; C. berberorum Matschie, 1892; C. corylinus (Matschie, 1912); C. medjerdae (Matschie, 1912); C. aharonii (Matschie, 1912); C. spatzi (Matschie, 1912); C. roothi (Roberts, 1926); C. coloniae Thomas, 1926; C. michaelis Heptner, 1945

= Caracal =

Medium-sized wild cat

The caracal (Caracal caracal) is a wild cat native to Africa, the Middle East, Central Asia, and arid areas of Pakistan and northwestern India. It is characterised by a robust build, long legs, a short face, long tufted ears, relatively short tail, and long canine teeth. Its coat is uniformly reddish tan or sandy, while the ventral parts are lighter with small reddish markings. It reaches 40–50 cm (16–20 in) at the shoulder and weighs 8–19 kg (18–42 lb). It was first scientifically described by German naturalist Johann Christian Daniel von Schreber in 1776. Three subspecies are recognised.

Typically nocturnal, the caracal is highly secretive and difficult to observe. It is territorial, and lives mainly alone or in pairs. The caracal is a carnivore that typically preys upon birds, rodents, and other small mammals. It can leap higher than 3.0 m (9.8 ft) and catch birds in midair. It stalks its prey until it is within 5 m (16 ft) of it, after which it runs it down and kills it with a bite to the throat or to the back of the neck. Both sexes become sexually mature by the time they are one year old and breed throughout the year. Gestation lasts between two and three months, resulting in a litter of one to six kittens. Juveniles leave their mothers at the age of nine to ten months, though a few females stay back with their mothers. The average lifespan of captive caracals is nearly 16 years.

== Etymology ==
The name 'caracal' was proposed by Georges Buffon in 1761 who referred to its Turkish name 'Karrah-kulak' or 'Kara-coulac', meaning 'black ear'. The name is pronounced /ˈkær.ə.kæl, ˈkɛr-/

The caracal is also known as desert lynx and Persian lynx. The 'lynx' of the Greeks and Romans was most probably the caracal, and the name 'lynx' is sometimes still applied to it, but the present-day lynx proper is a separate genus.

== Taxonomy and phylogeny ==
Felis caracal was the scientific name used by Johann Christian Daniel von Schreber in 1776 who described a caracal skin from the Cape of Good Hope. In 1843, John Edward Gray placed it in the genus Caracal. It is placed in the family Felidae and subfamily Felinae.

In the 19th and 20th centuries, several caracal specimens were described and proposed as subspecies. Since 2017, three subspecies have been recognised as valid:

- Southern caracal (C. c. caracal) (Schreber, 1776) – occurs in Southern and East Africa
- Northern caracal (C. c. nubicus) (Fischer, 1829) – occurs in North and West Africa
- Asiatic caracal (C. c. schmitzi) (Matschie, 1912) – occurs in Asia

=== Phylogeny ===
Results of a phylogenetic study indicates that the caracal and the African golden cat (Caracal aurata) diverged between 2.93 and 1.19 million years ago. These two species together with the serval (Leptailurus serval) form the Caracal lineage, which diverged between 11.56 and 6.66 million years ago. The ancestor of this lineage arrived in Africa between 8.5 and 5.6 million years ago.

The relationship of the caracal is considered as follows:

- - - Pardofelis
      Marbled cat (P. marmorata)
    - Catopuma
      - Bay cat (C. badia)
      - Asian golden cat (C. temminckii)
  - - - Caracal lineage
        - Leptailurus
          Serval (L. serval)
        - Caracal
          - Caracal
          - African golden cat (C. aurata)
      - - Leopardus
        - - Lynx
          - - - Acinonyx
              - Puma
            - - - Otocolobus
                - Prionailurus
              - Felis

== Characteristics ==
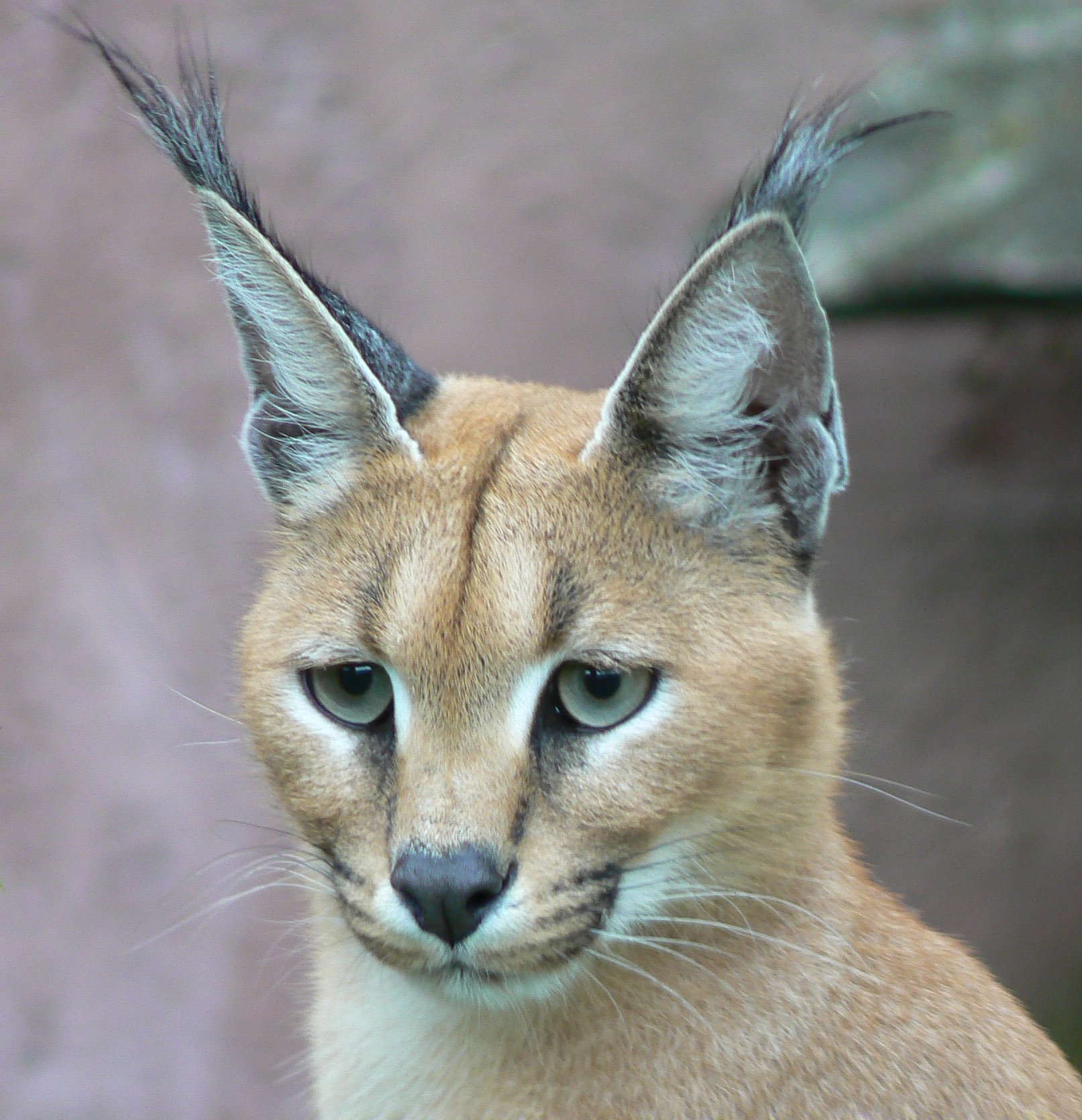
A close facial view of a caracal, with the typical tufted ears and the black facial markings

The caracal is a slender, moderately sized cat characterised by a robust build, a short face, long canine teeth, tufted ears, and long legs. It reaches nearly 40–50 cm (16–20 in) at the shoulder. The tan, bushy tail extends to the hocks. The caracal is sexually dimorphic; the females are smaller than the males in most bodily parameters.

The prominent facial features include the 4.5 cm (1.8 in) long black tufts on the ears, two black stripes from the forehead to the nose, the black outline of the mouth, the distinctive black facial markings, and the white patches surrounding the eyes and the mouth. The eyes appear to be narrowly open due to the lowered upper eyelid, probably an adaptation to shield the eyes from the sun's glare. The ear tufts may start drooping as the animal ages. The coat is uniformly reddish tan or sandy, though black caracals are also known. The underbelly and the insides of the legs are lighter, often with small reddish markings. The fur, soft, short, and dense, grows coarser in the summer. The ground hairs are denser in winter than in summer. The length of the guard hairs can be up to 3 cm (1.2 in) long in winter, but shorten to 2 cm (0.79 in) in summer. These features indicate the onset of moulting in the hot season, typically in October and November. The hind legs are longer than the forelegs, so the body appears to be sloping downward from the rump.

Male caracals measure in head-to-body length 78–108 cm (31–43 in) and have 21–34 cm (8.3–13.4 in) long tails; 77 male caracals ranged in weight between 7.2 and 19 kg (16 and 42 lb). The head-to-body length of females is 71–103 cm (28–41 in) with a tail of 18–31.5 cm (7.1–12.4 in); 63 females ranged in weight between 7 and 15.9 kg (15 and 35 lb).

The caracal is often confused with a lynx, as both cats have tufted ears. However, a notable point of difference between the two is that Lynx species are spotted and blotched, while the caracal shows no such markings on the coat. The African golden cat has a similar build as the caracal's, but is darker and lacks the ear tufts. The sympatric serval can be distinguished from the caracal by the former's lack of ear tufts, white spots behind the ears, spotted coat, longer legs, longer tail, and smaller footprints.

The skull of the caracal is high and rounded, featuring large auditory bullae, a well-developed supraoccipital crest normal to the sagittal crest, and a strong lower jaw. The caracal has a total of 30 teeth; the dental formula is 3.1.3.13.1.2.1. The deciduous dentition is 3.1.23.1.2. The canines are up to 2 cm (0.79 in) long and sharp. The caracal lacks the second upper premolars, and the upper molars are diminutive. The large paws have four digits in the hind legs and five in the fore legs. The first digit of the fore leg remains above the ground and features the dewclaw. The sharp and retractile claws are larger but less curved in the hind legs.

== Distribution and habitat ==
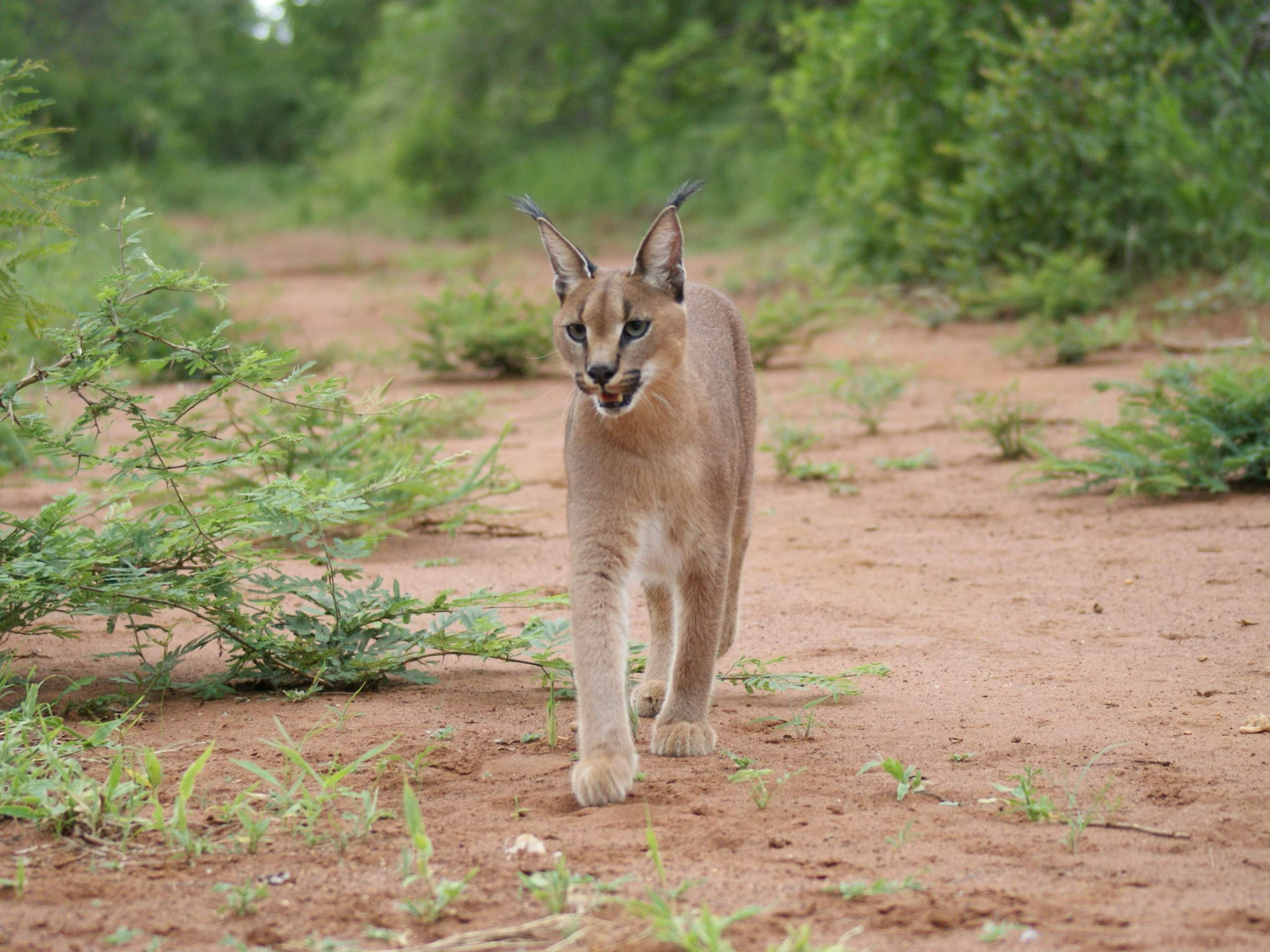
Caracals inhabit dry areas with some cover.

In Africa, the caracal is widely distributed south of the Sahara, but considered rare in North Africa. In Asia, it occurs from the Arabian Peninsula, Middle East, Turkmenistan, Uzbekistan to western India. It inhabits forests, savannas, marshy lowlands, semideserts, and scrub forests, but prefers dry areas with low rainfall and availability of cover. In montane habitats such as in the Ethiopian Highlands, it occurs up to an elevation of 3,000 m (9,800 ft).

In Ethiopia's Degua Tembien massif, they can be seen along roads, sometimes as roadkills.

In the Emirate of Abu Dhabi, a male caracal was photographed by camera traps in Jebel Hafeet National Park in Al Ain Region, in spring 2019, the first such record since the mid-1980s. In the Emirate of Fujairah, a caracal was spotted in Wadi Wurayah in October 2025.

In south-western Turkey, caracals are present in a wildlife reserve in the provinces of Antalya and Muğla that is regularly used for recreational and agricultural activities. However, they avoid humans and are active mostly at night. In Uzbekistan, caracals were recorded only in the desert regions of the Ustyurt Plateau and Kyzylkum Desert. Between 2000 and 2017, 15 individuals were sighted alive, and at least 11 were killed by herders.

In Iran, the caracal has been recorded in Abbasabad Naein Reserve, Bahram'gur Protected Area, Kavir National Park and in Yazd province.

In India, the caracal occurs in Sariska Tiger Reserve and Ranthambhore National Park. Its contemporary distribution is limited to Rajasthan, Gujarat and Madhya Pradesh. The Indian population may be under 100.

== Ecology and behaviour ==
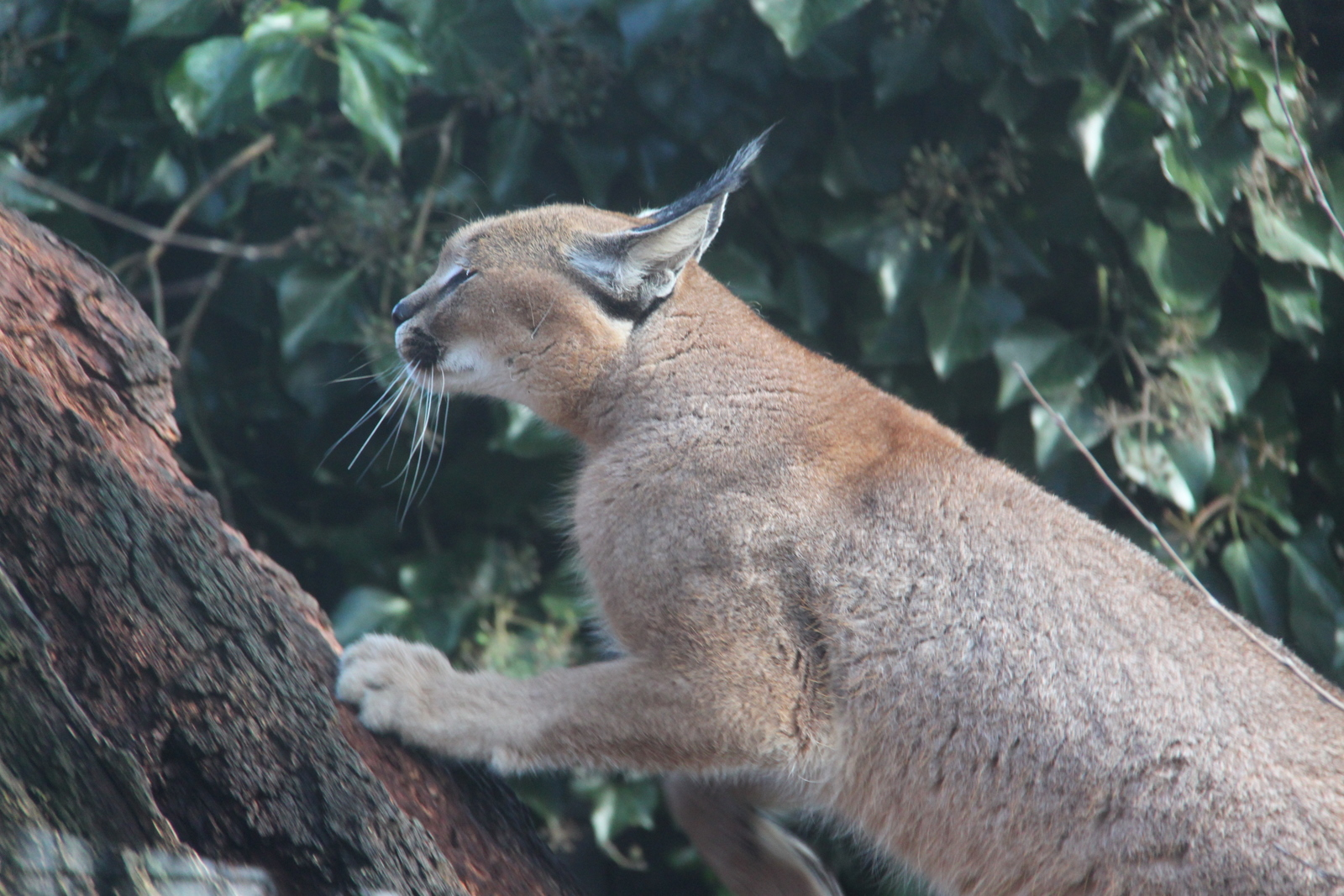
Caracals are efficient climbers.

The caracal is typically nocturnal, though some activity may be observed during the day as well. However, the cat is so secretive and difficult to observe that its activity at daytime might easily go unnoticed. A study in South Africa showed that caracals are most active when the air temperature drops below 20 °C (68 °F); activity typically ceases at higher temperatures. A solitary cat, the caracal mainly occurs alone or in pairs; the only groups seen are of mothers with their offspring. Females in oestrus temporarily pair with males. A territorial animal, the caracal marks rocks and vegetation in its territory with urine and probably with dung, which is not covered with soil. Claw scratching is prominent, and dung middens are typically not formed. In Israel, males are found to have territories averaging 220 km^{2} (85 sq mi), while that of females averaged 57 km^{2} (22 sq mi). The male territories vary from 270–1,116 km^{2} (104–431 sq mi) in Saudi Arabia. In Mountain Zebra National Park, the home ranges of females vary between 4.0 and 6.5 km^{2} (1.5 and 2.5 sq mi). These territories overlap extensively. The conspicuous ear tufts and the facial markings often serve as a method of visual communication; caracals have been observed interacting with each other by moving the head from side to side so that the tufts flicker rapidly. Like other cats, the caracal meows, growls, hisses, spits, and purrs.

=== Diet and hunting ===
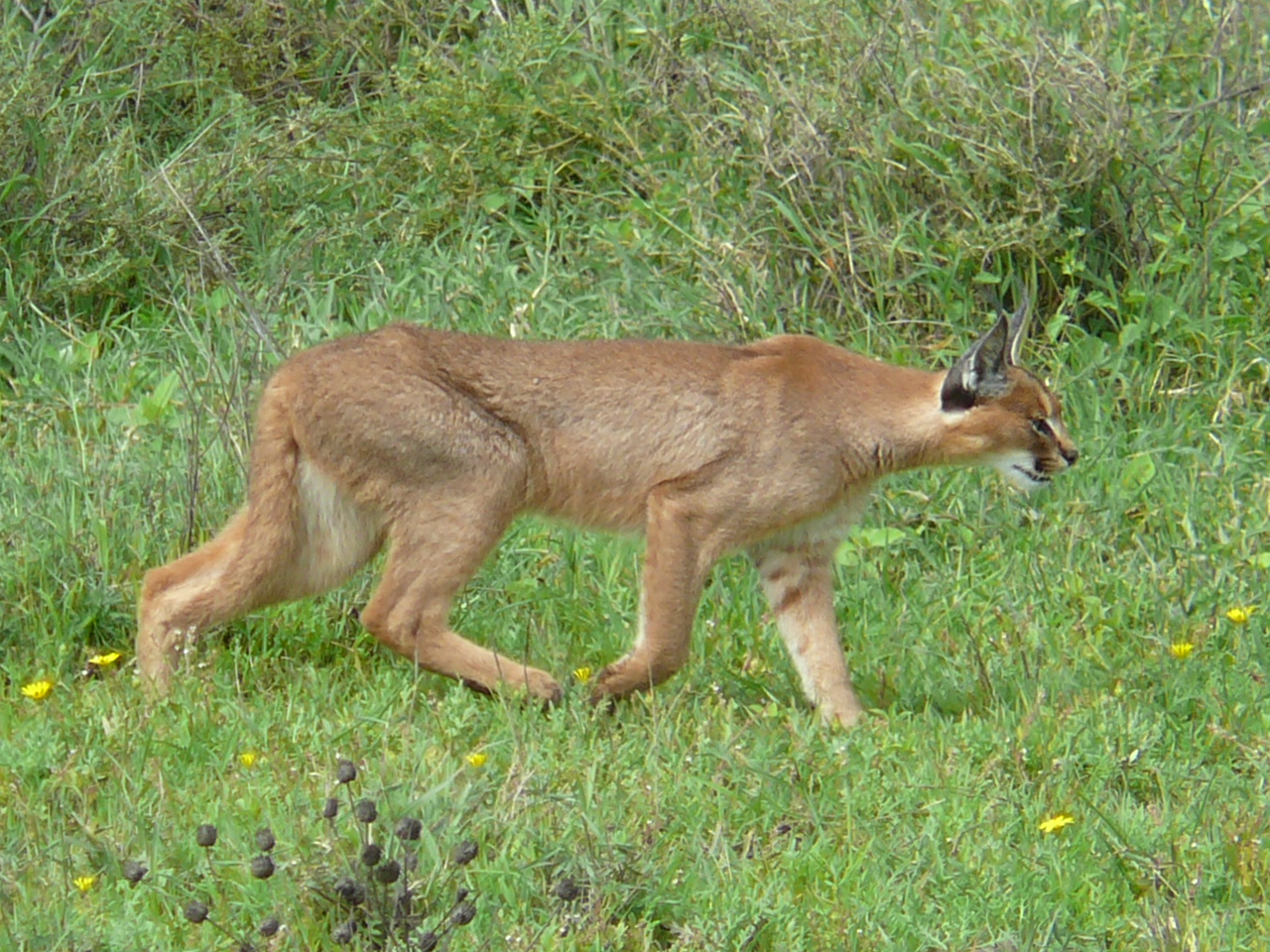
A caracal hunting in the Serengeti

The caracal typically preys on small mammals, which generally comprise at least 80% of its diet; and it also targets small Cercopithecidae monkeys and larger antelopes such as young kudu, impala, mountain gazelle, dorcas gazelle, Cape bushbuck, gerenuk, mountain reedbuck, Sharpe's grysbok and springbok. The remaining percentage is made up of lizards, snakes and insects. Rodents comprise a significant portion of its diet in western India. It tends to focus on the most abundant prey species. Occasionally, it consumes grasses and grapes, which help to clear the immune system and stomach of any parasites.

In South Africa, caracals prey on Cape grysbok, common duiker, bush vlei rats, rock hyrax and Cape hare. In areas where sheep and goat are farmed, caracals have also been documented preying on small livestock, but this is only a small and seasonal portion of their diet when wild prey is scarce. Caracals are estimated to have caused about 11% of African penguin mortality in Simon's Town breeding colony between January 1999 and September 2021.

The caracals's speed and agility make it an efficient hunter, able to take down prey two to three times its size. The powerful hind legs allow it to leap more than 3 m (9.8 ft) in the air to catch birds on the wing. It can even twist and change its direction mid-air. It is an adroit climber. It stalks its prey until it is within 5 m (16 ft), following which it can launch into a sprint. While large prey such as antelopes are suffocated by a throat bite, smaller prey are killed by a bite on the back of the neck. Kills are consumed immediately, and less commonly dragged to cover. It returns to large kills if undisturbed. It has been observed to begin feeding on antelope kills at the hind parts. It may scavenge at times, though this has not been frequently observed.

=== Reproduction ===
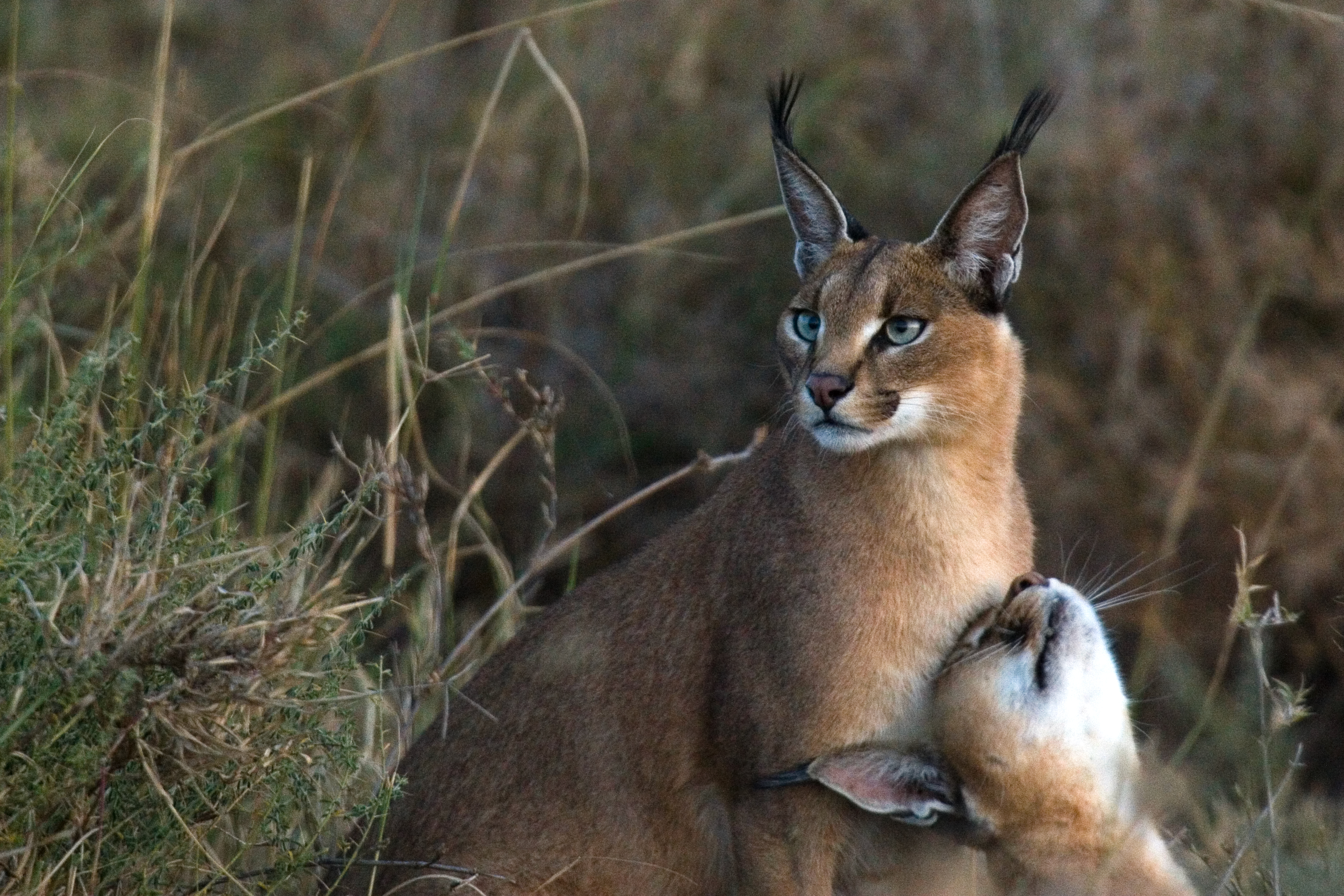
Mating pair in Serengeti National Park

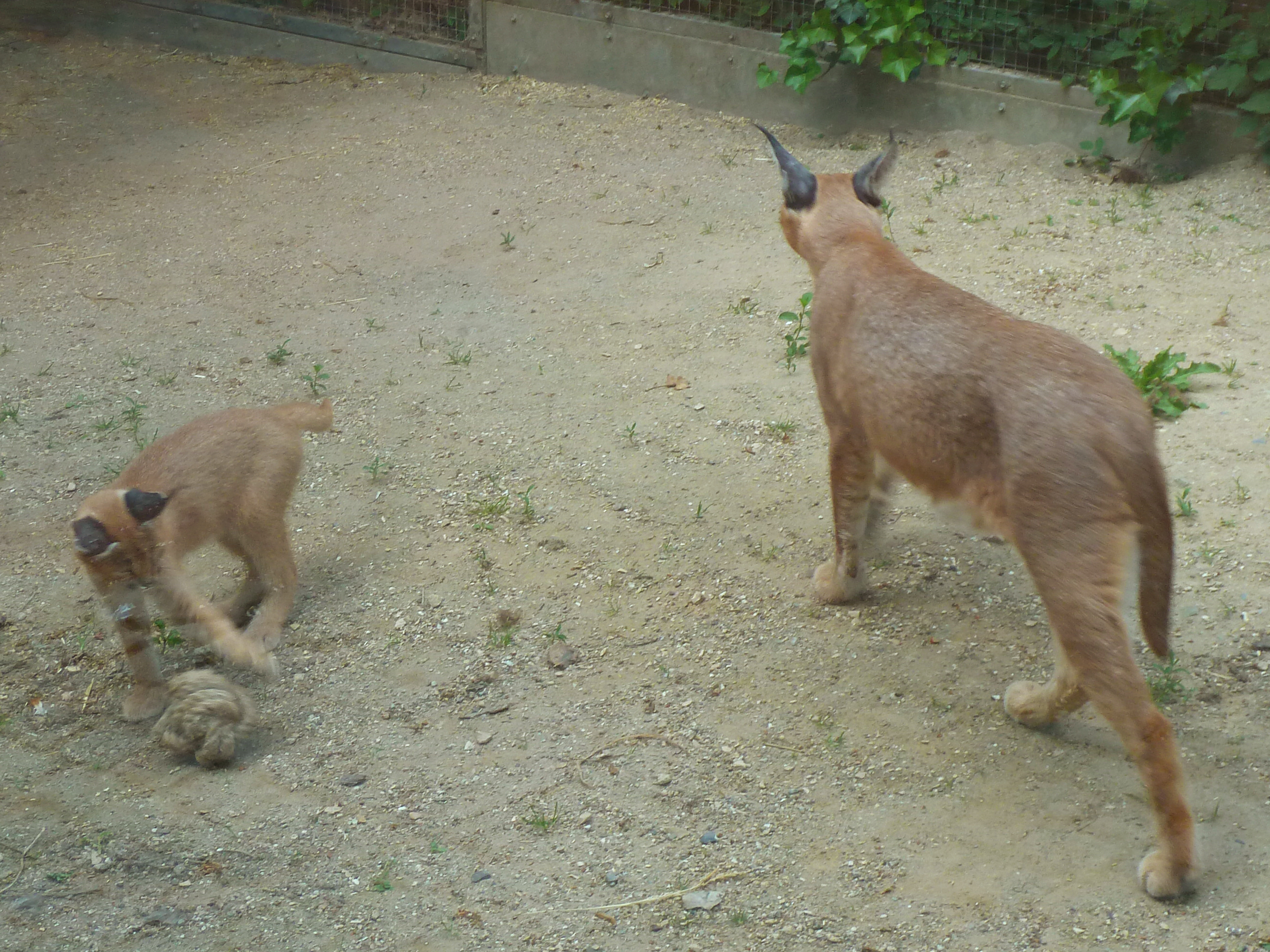
Caracal mother and kitten

Both sexes become sexually mature by the time they are a year old; production of gametes begins even earlier at seven to ten months. However, successful mating takes place only at 12 to 15 months. Breeding takes place throughout the year. Oestrus, one to three days long, recurs every two weeks unless the female is pregnant. Females in oestrus show a spike in urine-marking, and form temporary pairs with males. Mating has not been extensively studied; a limited number of observations suggest that copulation, lasting nearly four minutes on average, begins with the male smelling the areas urine-marked by the female, which then rolls on the ground. He then approaches and mounts her. The pair separate after copulation.

Gestation lasts about two to three months, following which a litter consisting of one to six kittens is born. Births generally peak from October to February. Births take place in dense vegetation or deserted burrows of aardvarks and porcupines. Kittens are born with their eyes and ears shut and the claws not retractable (unable to be drawn inside); the coat resembles that of adults, but the abdomen is spotted. Eyes open by ten days, but it takes longer for the vision to become normal. The ears become erect and the claws become retractable by the third or the fourth week. Around the same time, the kittens start roaming their birthplace, and start playing among themselves by the fifth or the sixth week. They begin taking solid food around the same time; they have to wait for nearly three months before they make their first kill. As the kittens start moving about by themselves, the mother starts shifting them every day. All the milk teeth appear in 50 days, and permanent dentition is completed in 10 months. Juveniles begin dispersing at nine to ten months, though a few females stay back with their mothers. The average lifespan of the caracal in captivity is nearly 16 years.

In the 1990s, a captive caracal spontaneously mated with a domestic cat in the Moscow Zoo, resulting in a felid hybrid offspring.

== Threats ==
The caracal is listed as Least Concern on the IUCN Red List since 2002, as it is widely distributed in over 50 range countries, where the threats to caracal populations vary in extent. Habitat loss due to agricultural expansion, the building of roads and settlements is a major threat in all range countries. It is thought to be close to extinction in North Africa, critically endangered in Pakistan, endangered in Jordan, but stable in central and Southern Africa. Local people kill caracal to protect livestock, or in retaliation for its preying on small livestock. Additionally, it is threatened by hunting for the pet trade on the Arabian Peninsula. In Turkey and Iran, caracals are frequently killed in road accidents. In Uzbekistan, the major threat to caracal is killing by herders in retaliation for livestock losses. Guarding techniques and sheds are inadequate to protect small livestock like goats and sheep from being attacked by predators. Additionally, similarly to Ethiopia, heavy-traffic roads crossing caracal habitat pose a potential threat for the species.

== Conservation ==
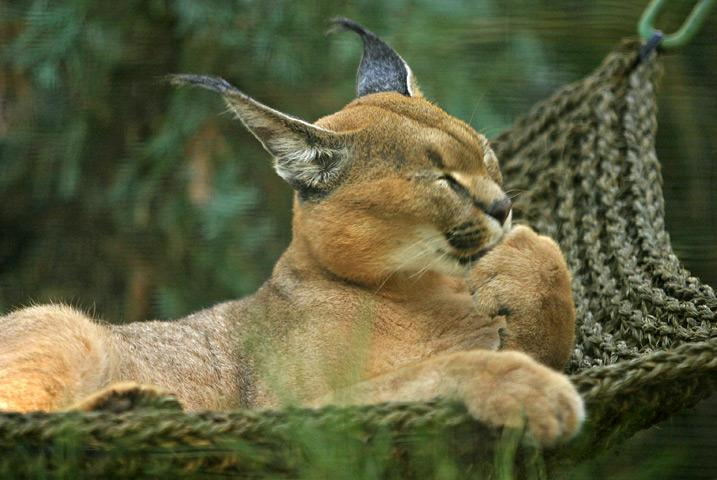
A caracal in the San Diego Zoo

African caracal populations are listed under CITES Appendix II, while Asian populations come under CITES Appendix I. Hunting of caracal is prohibited in Afghanistan, Algeria, Egypt, India, Iran, Israel, Jordan, Kazakhstan, Lebanon, Morocco, Pakistan, Syria, Tajikistan, Tunisia, Turkey, Turkmenistan, and Uzbekistan. Caracals occur in a number of protected areas across their range.

In South Africa, the caracal is considered Least Concern, as it is widespread and adaptable to a variety of habitats. It is tolerant to human-dominated areas, although it has been persecuted for many decades. Farmers are encouraged to report sightings of caracals, both dead and alive, and livestock killed by caracals to the national Predation Management Information Centre.

The Central Asian caracal population is listed as Critically Endangered in Uzbekistan since 2009, and in Kazakhstan since 2010.

== In culture ==
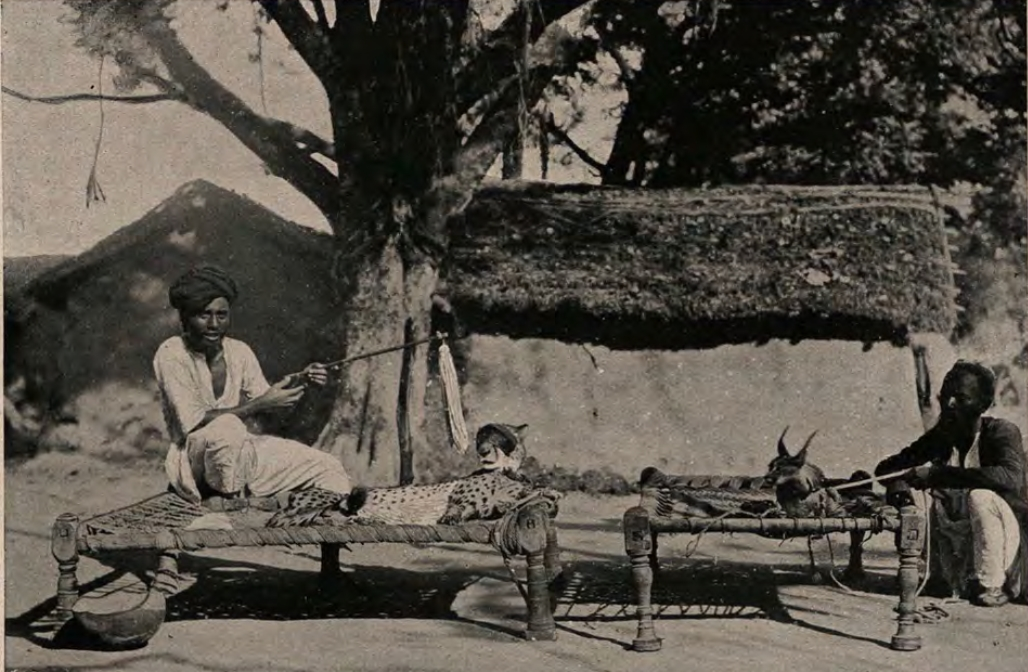
A cheetah and a caracal kept for coursing by Rajasthani royalty, c. 1890

The caracal appears to have been religiously significant in the ancient Egyptian culture, as it occurs in paintings and as bronze figurines; sculptures are thought to have guarded the tombs of pharaohs. Embalmed caracals have also been discovered.

The caracal was esteemed for its ability to catch birds in flight and was used for coursing by Mughal emperors in India at least since the Delhi Sultanate. Chinese emperors used caracals as gifts. In the 13th and the 14th centuries, Yuan dynasty rulers bought numerous caracals, cheetahs (Acinonyx jubatus) and tigers (Panthera tigris) from Muslim merchants in the western parts of the empire in return for gold, silver, copper cash and silk. According to the Ming Shilu, the subsequent Ming dynasty continued this practice. Until the 20th century, the caracal was used in hunts of Indian rulers to hunt small game, while the cheetah was used for larger game. In those times, caracals were used to hunt bustards, francolins, and other game birds. They were also placed in arenas with flocks of pigeons and people would bet on which caracal would kill the largest number of pigeons. This probably gave rise to the expression "to put the cat among the pigeons". Its pelt was used for making fur coats.
