= Golden cat =

Golden cat may refer to:

- African golden cat, Caracal aurata, a wild cat distributed in the rain forests of West and Central Africa
- Asian golden cat, Catopuma temminckii, a medium-sized wild cat of South-Eastern Asia
- Bay cat, Catopuma badia, a wild cat endemic to the island of Borneo
- Domestic cat with a golden, or “sunshine”, coloured coat
