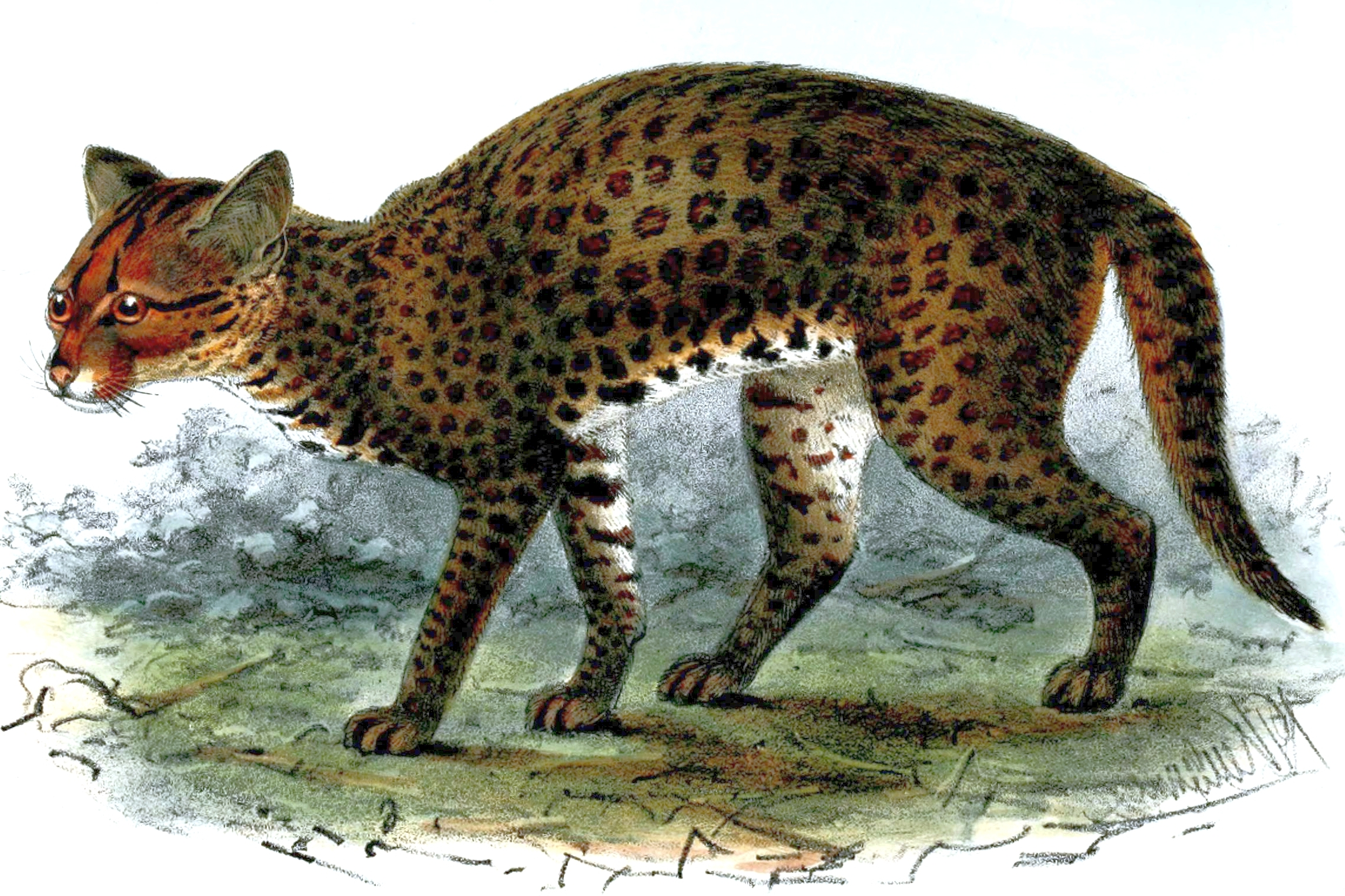

Conservation status
- Vulnerable (IUCN 3.1)

Scientific classification
- Kingdom: Animalia
- Phylum: Chordata
- Class: Mammalia
- Order: Carnivora
- Family: Felidae
- Genus: Caracal
- Species: C. aurata

Binomial name
- Caracal aurata (Temminck, 1827)

Subspecies
- C. a. aurata; C. a. celidogaster
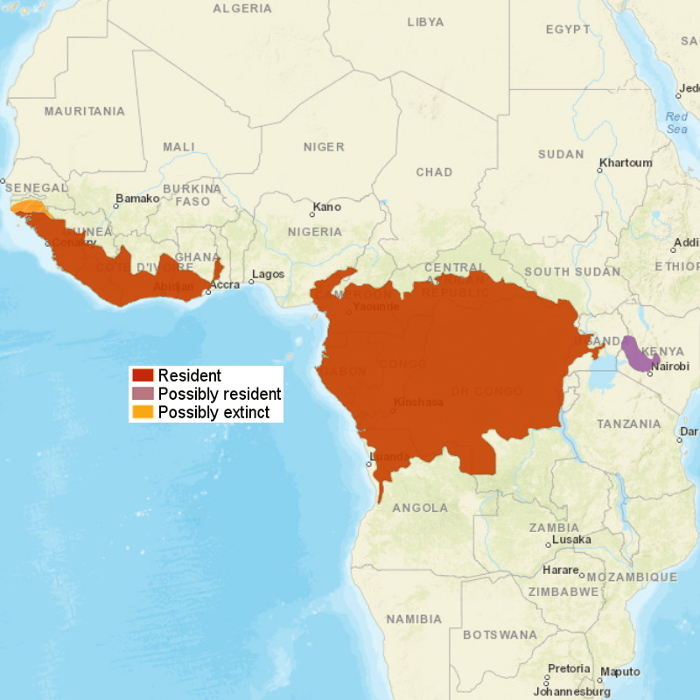
- Distribution of the African golden cat, 2015

Synonyms
- Profelis aurata

= African golden cat =

Small wild cat

The African golden cat (Caracal aurata) is a wild cat endemic to the rainforests of West and Central Africa. It is threatened due to deforestation and bushmeat hunting and listed as Vulnerable on the IUCN Red List. It is a close relative of both the caracal and the serval. Previously, it was placed in the genus Profelis. Its body size ranges from 61 to 101 cm (24 to 40 in) with a 16 to 46 cm (6.3 to 18.1 in) long tail.

== Characteristics ==
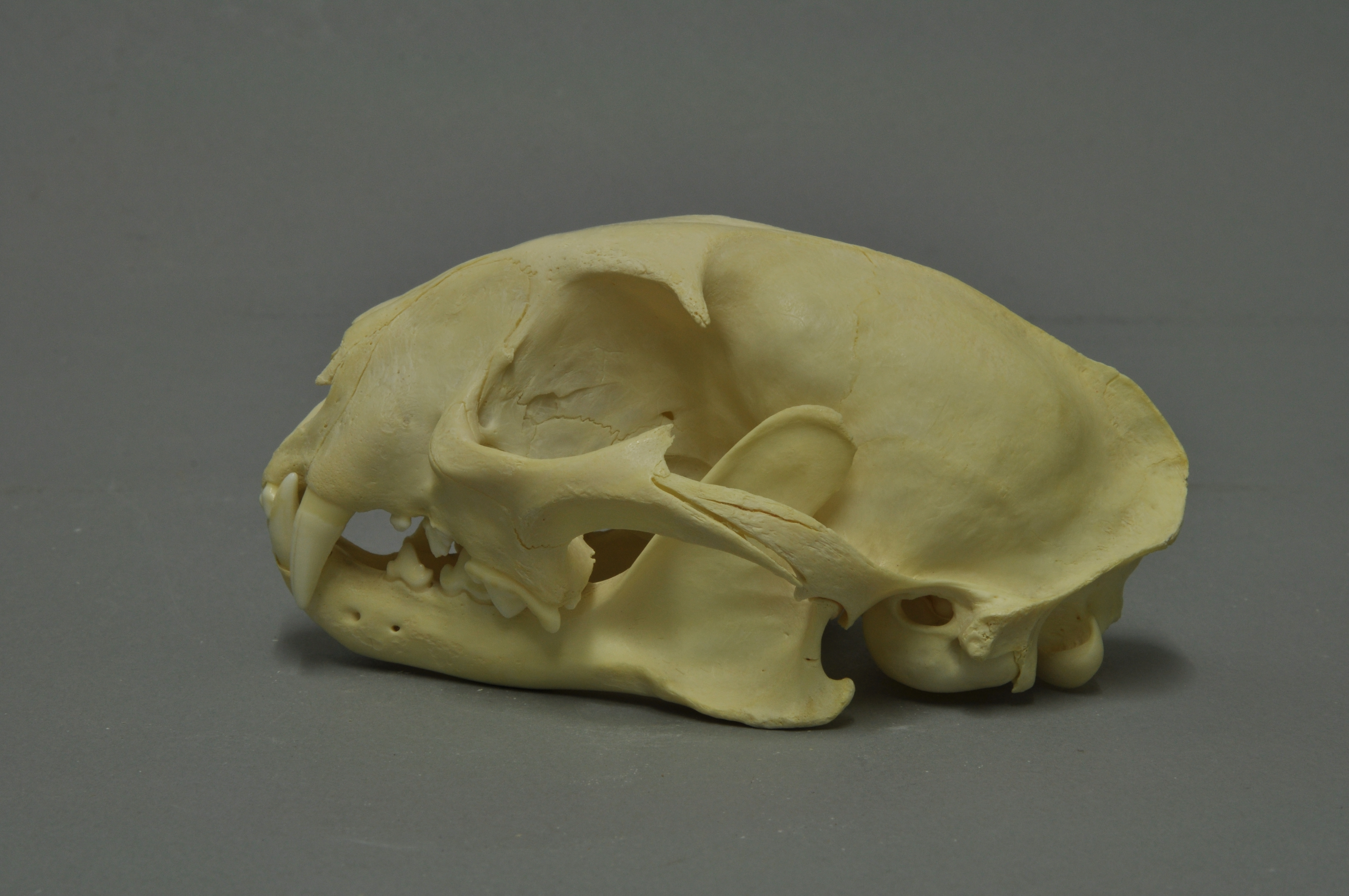
Skull of an African golden cat in the Museum Wiesbaden

The African golden cat has a fur colour ranging from chestnut or reddish-brown, greyish brown to dark slate. Some are spotted, with the spots ranging from faded tan to black in colour. In others the spotting pattern is limited to the belly and inner legs. Its undersides and areas around the eyes, cheeks, chin, and throat are lighter in colour to almost white. Its tail is darker on the top and either heavily banded, lightly banded or plain, ending in a black tip. Cats in the western parts of its range tend to have heavier spotting than those in the eastern region. Two color morphs, a red and a grey phase, were once thought to indicate separate species, rather than colour variations of the same species. Grey skins have hairs that are not pigmented in their middle zones, whereas hair of red skins is pigmented intensively red. Hair of melanistic skins is entirely black.

Skins of African golden cats can be identified by the presence of a distinctive whorled ridge of fur in front of the shoulders, where the hairs change direction. It is about twice the size of a domestic cat. Its rounded head is very small in relation to its body size. It is a heavily built cat, with stocky, long legs, a relatively short tail, and large paws. Body length usually varies within the range of 61 to 101 cm (24 to 40 in). Tail length ranges from 16 to 46 cm (6.3 to 18.1 in), and shoulder height is about 38 to 55 cm (15 to 22 in). The cat weighs around 5.5 to 16 kg (12 to 35 lb), with males being larger than females.

Overall, the African golden cat resembles the caracal, but has shorter untufted ears, a longer tail, and a shorter, more rounded face. It has small, rounded ears. Its eye colour ranges from pale blue to brown.

== Taxonomy ==
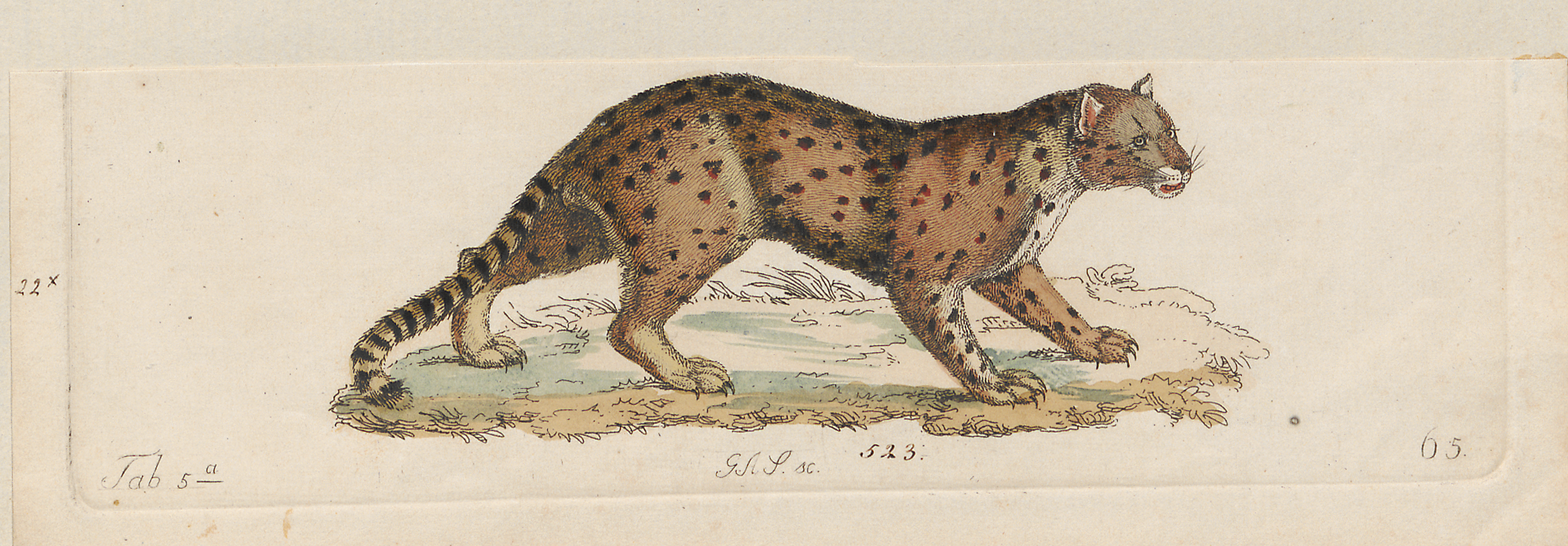
Caracal aurata celidogaster (Temminck, 1827), a subspecies. 1834, Iconographia Zoologica

Felis aurata was the scientific name used by Coenraad Jacob Temminck who described a reddish-brown coloured cat skin in 1827 that he had bought from a merchant in London. Temminck also described a grey coloured skin of a cat with chocolate brown spots that had lived in the menagerie in London. He named it Felis celidogaster. Felis neglecta proposed by John Edward Gray in 1838 was a brownish grey cat skin from Sierra Leone. Felis rutilus proposed by George Robert Waterhouse in 1842 was a reddish cat skin from Sierra Leone. Felis chrysothrix cottoni proposed by Richard Lydekker in 1906 was a dark grey cat skin from the Ituri Rainforest. A black cat skin from eastern Congo was proposed as Felis maka in 1942.

In 1858, Nikolai Severtzov proposed the generic names Profelis with F. celidogaster as type species, and Chrysailurus with F. neglecta as type species. In 1917, Reginald Innes Pocock subordinated both the African golden cat and the Asian golden cat to Profelis. This classification was followed by several subsequent authors.

Phylogenetic analysis of cat samples showed that the African golden cat is closely related with the caracal (Caracal caracal). These two species, together with the serval (Leptailurus serval), form the Caracal lineage, one of the eight genetic lineages of the Felidae that evolved nearly 8.5 million years ago. Because of this close relationship, the African golden cat has been placed into the genus Caracal.

Two African golden cat subspecies are recognised as valid since 2017:

- C. a. aurata (Temminck, 1827) − east of the Congo River
- C. a. celidogaster (Temminck, 1827) − west of the Cross River

=== Phylogeny ===
The following cladogram shows the phylogenetic relationships of the African golden cat:

- Felinae
  - Bay cat lineage
    - Pardofelis
      Marbled cat (P. marmorata)
    - Catopuma
      - Bay cat (C. badia)
      - Asian golden cat (C. temminckii)
  - - - Caracal lineage
        - Leptailurus
          Serval (L. serval)
        - Caracal
          - Caracal (C. caracal)
          - African golden cat
      - - Leopardus
        - - - Andean mountain cat (L. jacobita)
            - Colocolo (L. colocolo)
          - - - Geoffroy's cat (L. geoffroyi)
              - Kodkod (L. guigna)
            - Oncilla (L. tigrinus)
      - - Lynx lineage
          Lynx
        - - Puma lineage
            - Acinonyx
            - - Puma
              - Herpailurus
          - - Leopard cat lineage
              - Otocolobus
              - Prionailurus
            - Domestic cat lineage
              Felis

== Distribution and habitat ==
The African golden cat is distributed from Senegal to the Central African Republic, Kenya and as far south as northern Angola. It inhabits tropical forests from sea level to an elevation of 3,000 m (9,800 ft). It prefers dense, moist forest with heavy undergrowth close to rivers but lives also in cloud forest, bamboo forests, and high moorland habitats.

In Guinea's National Park of Upper Niger, it was recorded during surveys conducted from 1996 to 1997.

In Uganda's Kibale National Park, an African golden cat was recorded in an Uvariopsis forest patch in 2008. In Gabon's Moukalaba-Doudou National Park, it was recorded in forested areas during surveys in 2012. African Golden cats were recorded in Tanzania's Minziro Forest Reserve in 2018 for the first time.

== Ecology and behaviour ==
Due to its extremely reclusive habits, little is known about the behaviour of African golden cats. They are solitary animals, and are normally crepuscular or nocturnal, although they have also been observed hunting during the day, depending on the availability of local prey.

African golden cats are able to climb, but hunt primarily on the ground. They mainly feed on tree hyrax, rodents, but also hunt birds, small monkeys, duikers, young of giant forest hog, and small antelope. They have also been known to take domestic poultry and livestock.

=== Reproduction ===
Knowledge of the African golden cat's reproductive habits is based on captive individuals. The female gives birth to one or two kittens after a gestation period of around 75 days. The kittens weigh 180 to 235 g (6.3 to 8.3 oz). Their eyes open within a week of birth, and they are weaned at 6–8 weeks. They grow and develop rapidly in comparison with other small cat species. One individual was reported to be scaling a 40-cm wall within 16 days of birth, reflecting a high degree of physical agility from an early age. Females reach sexual maturity at 11 months of age, and males at around 18 months. In captivity, they live up to 12 years. Their lifespan in the wild is unknown.

== Threats ==
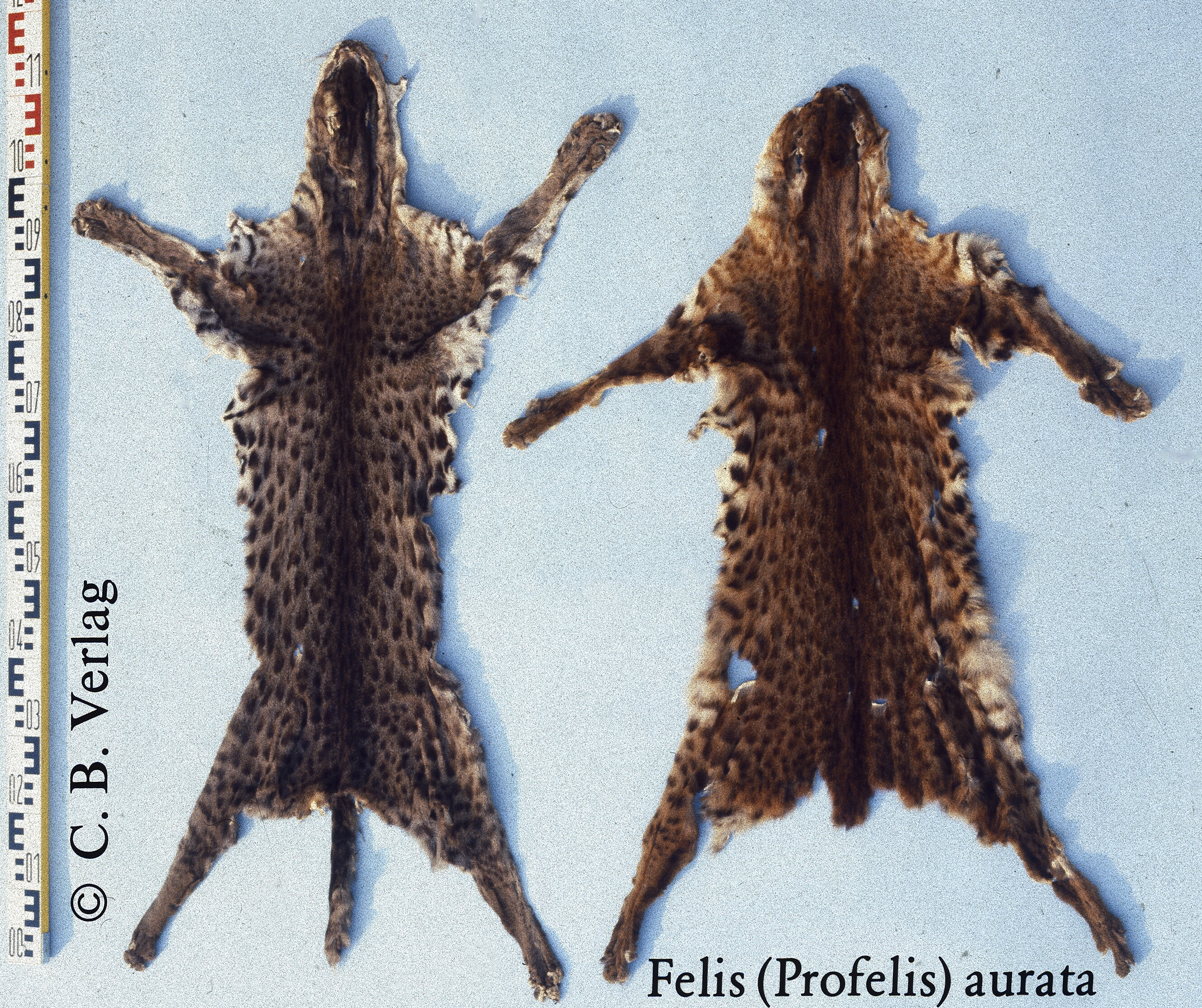
African golden cat pelts

The African golden cat is threatened by extensive deforestation of tropical rainforests, their conversion to oil palm plantations coupled with mining activities and road building, thus destroying its essential habitat. It is also threatened by bushmeat hunting, particularly in the Congo Basin. A dead African golden cat was offered as bushmeat in Angola's Uíge Province in May 2018.

== Conservation ==
The African golden cat is listed in CITES Appendix II. Hunting African golden cats is prohibited in Angola, Benin, Burkina Faso, Congo, Côte d'Ivoire, Democratic Republic of Congo, Ghana, Kenya, Liberia, Nigeria, Rwanda, and Sierra Leone. In Gabon, Liberia and Togo, hunting regulations are in place.
