= Balpakram =

Balpakram is located in South Garo Hills district in Meghalaya, India.

Balpakram is famous for its forest covered canyon-cum-gorge, which is now part of a National Park. The park also includes the Balpakram plateau and adjacent forests. The area lies in the southern part of Meghalaya. Garos, the local tribe inhabiting the region, believe this hill to be the sort of resting place for departed souls. This belief is due to many strange yet natural formations, physical and biological, found in the area. The place is also known for rare flora and fauna species and marine fossils. Balpakram is a hotspot of biodiversity in Meghalaya.

Balpakram has a remnant population of the endangered wild water buffalo Bubalus arnee. An interesting feature of the area is its small population of the red panda that has generated curiosity across the world. Balpakram is an important habitat of the Asian elephant. The park has the last remaining herds of the gaur or Indian bison in Meghalaya. Elsewhere in the state only stray animals are found. There are eight species of cats, ranging from tiger to marbled cat.

Balpakram has a diverse primate population having seven species. The rare stump-tailed macaque is rarely seen but the pig-tailed macaque is often encountered. Hoolocks are well distributed all over the park except the grassy plateau.

Balpakram is also an Important Bird Area. It is an important tourist destination and is accessible from Guwahati via Tura and Baghmara as well as via Shillong and Ranikor. Besides the untouched forest in the gorge and the picturesque plateau, the panoramic view of Tanguar Haor, a Ramsar Site in northern Bangladesh are noteworthy features of Balpakram.
