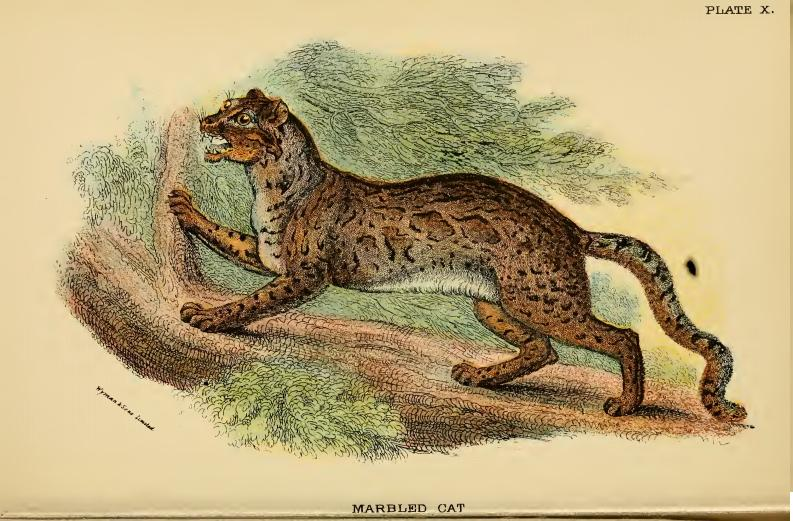
- Illustration of Catolynx marmoratus

Scientific classification
- Kingdom: Animalia
- Phylum: Chordata
- Class: Mammalia
- Infraclass: Placentalia
- Order: Carnivora
- Family: Felidae
- Subfamily: Felinae
- Genus: Pardofelis; Severtzov, 1858

Species
- Pardofelis marmorata
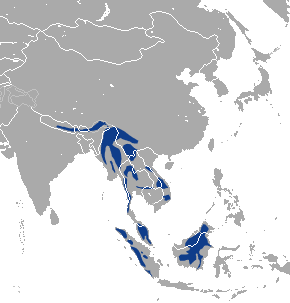
- Marbled cat range

= Pardofelis =

Genus of carnivores

Pardofelis is a genus of the cat family Felidae. This genus is defined as including one species native to Southeast Asia: the marbled cat. Two other species, formerly classified to this genus, now belong to the genus Catopuma.

The word pardofelis is composed of the Latin words pardus (pard), and felis (cat) in allusion to the spots of the type species, the marbled cat.

== Taxonomic history ==
Pardofelis was first proposed by the Russian explorer and naturalist Nikolai Severtzov in 1858 as generic name comprising a single felid species occurring in tropical Asia, the marbled cat Pardofelis marmorata. The British zoologist Reginald Innes Pocock recognized the taxonomic classification of Pardofelis in 1917 as comprising not only the marbled cat but also the Borneo bay cat Pardofelis badia, because of similarities in the shape of their skulls. In 1939, he described Pardofelis marmorata on the basis of skins and skulls which originated in Java, Sumatra, Darjeeling and Sikkim.

Until 2006, the classification of Pardofelis as a monotypic genus was widely accepted. Genetic analysis carried out at the turn of the century revealed a close genetic relationship with the Borneo bay cat Pardofelis badia and the Asian golden cat Pardofelis temminckii. All of them diverged from the other felids about 9.4 million years ago, and have therefore been proposed to be placed in the genus Pardofelis. Meanwhile, Pardofelis is considered a synonym of Catopuma.

The relationship between this branch and others on the feline family tree has also become clearer. Pardofelis species do not stem from the Pantherinae subfamily but belong to the other main branch of mostly smaller cat species, the Felinae. They share a more recent common ancestor with servals, caracals, and African golden cats than with any other existing cat genus.

== Characteristics ==
Pardofelis are small long-tailed, short-headed cats with rounded ears, distinguishable from Prionailurus and related Oriental genera by having the skull higher and more rounded, with the mesopterygoid fossa lanceolate in front and provided with thickened margins or a better developed external crest. The skull is short, broad, strongly convex in dorsal profile, not comparatively long and low. The nasal branch of the premaxilla is thin, not expanded, the summit of the muzzle is not compressed above, the maxilla is not expanded where it abuts against the nasal bone, and develops no excrescence outside the suborbital foramen.
