= William Charles Linnaeus Martin =

English naturalist

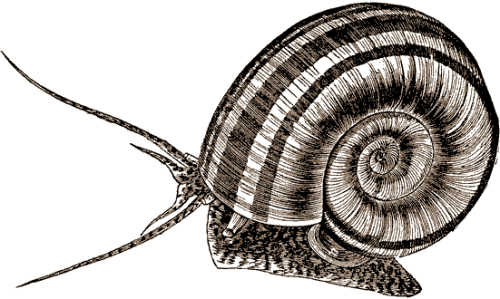
Drawing by Martin

William Charles Linnaeus Martin (1798–1864) was an English naturalist.

== Biography ==
William Charles Linnaeus Martin was the son of William Martin (naturalist) and his wife, Mary. William Martin had published early colour books on the fossils of Derbyshire, and named his son Linnaeus in honour of Carl Linnaeus's interest in the classification of living things.

Martin was the curator of the museum of the Zoological Society of London from 1830 to 1838, when he lost his appointment due to financial cutbacks. He then became a freelance natural history writer, publishing over a thousand articles and books, including A Natural History of Quadrupeds and other Mammiferous Animals (1841), The History of the Dog (1845), The History of the Horse (1845), and Pictorial Museum of Animated Nature (1848–9). Many of Martin's works centred around the study of farm animals, particularly in the years 1847–1858.

Martin died on 15 February 1864 at his home in Kent leaving a widow. He was a fellow of the Linnean Society.
