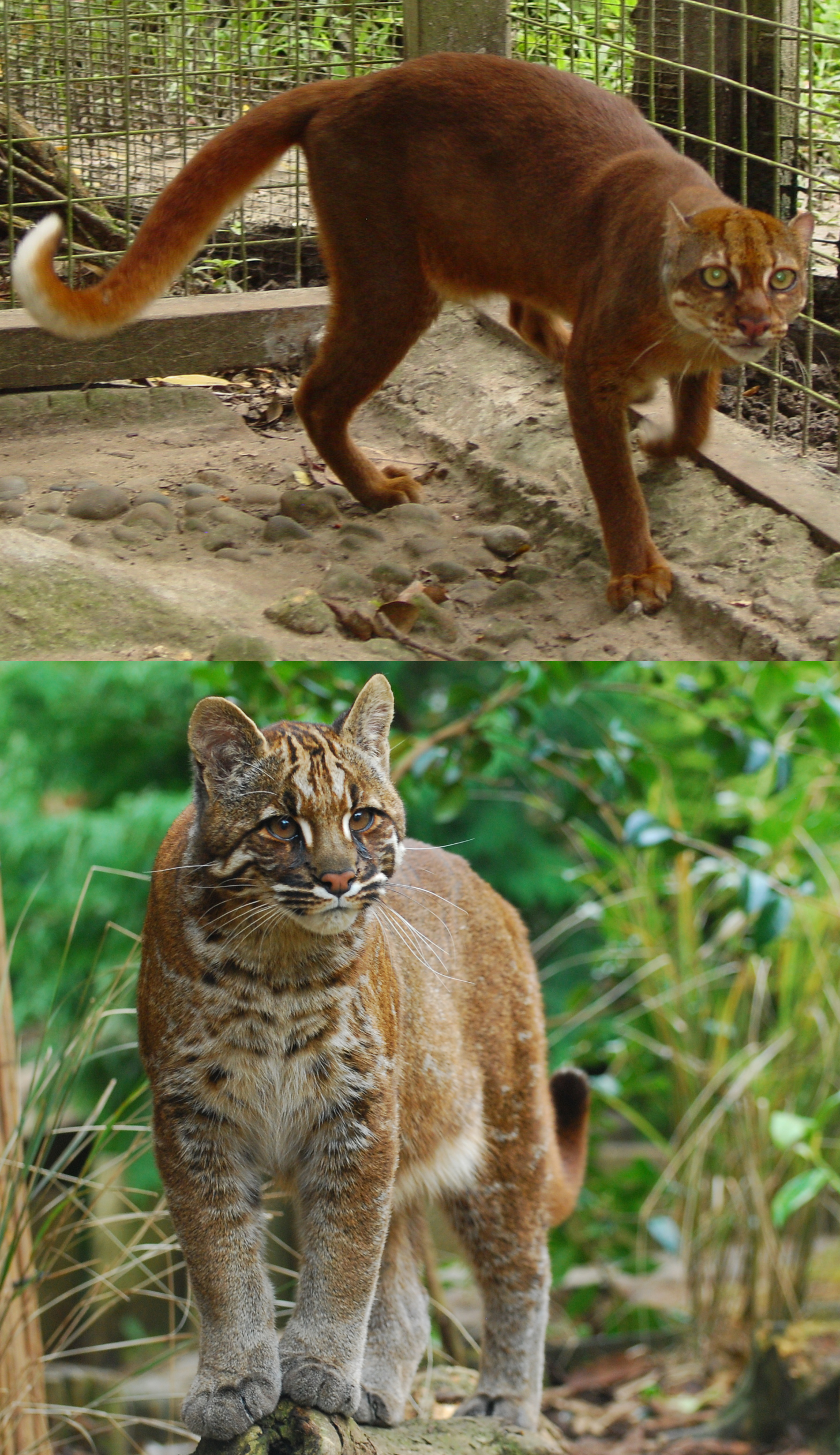
- Bay cat (C. badia) and Asian golden cat (C. temminckii)

Scientific classification
- Kingdom: Animalia
- Phylum: Chordata
- Class: Mammalia
- Infraclass: Placentalia
- Order: Carnivora
- Family: Felidae
- Subfamily: Felinae
- Genus: Catopuma; Severtzov, 1858

Type species
- Felis temminckii (Vigors & Horsfield, 1827)
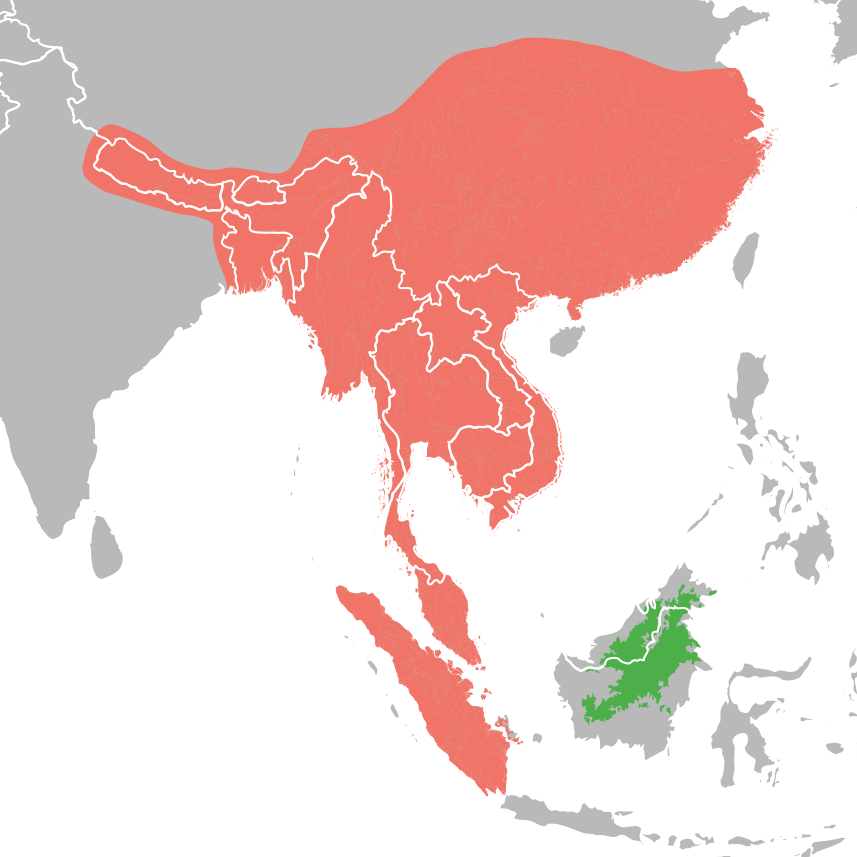
- Catopuma distribution C. temminckii in red, C. badia in green

Synonyms
- Badiofelis Pocock, 1932

= Catopuma =

Genus of carnivores

Catopuma is a genus of the Felidae containing two small cat species native to Southeast Asia, the Asian golden cat (C. temminckii) and the bay cat (C. badia). Both cats have similar pelage, with solid reddish brown coloration on their backs and darker markings on the head. They also exhibit colour morphs ranging from various browns to gray to black. The Asian golden cat occurs from northeast India to Sumatra, and the bay cat lives only on Borneo. Both inhabit forested areas.

The closest living relative of Catopuma is the marbled cat (Pardofelis marmorata), from which the common ancestor of Catopuma genetically diverged around 9.4 million years ago. The Asian golden cat and bay cat diverged from one another approximately 3.16 million years ago, before Borneo separated from the neighboring islands.

== Taxonomy ==
The name Catopuma was proposed by Nikolai Severtzov in 1858. The type species, Felis moormensis, had been described earlier by Brian Houghton Hodgson.

Genus Catopuma – Severtzov, 1858 – two species
Common name	Scientific name and subspecies	Range	Size and ecology	IUCN status and estimated population
Asian golden cat	Catopuma temminckii (Vigors & Horsfield, 1827) Two subspecies: C. t. temminckii occurs in Sumatra and the Malay Peninsula; C. t. moormensis Hodgson, 1831 occurs from eastern Nepal to China and Cambodia	Sri Lanka, Nepal, India, Pakistan, Bangladesh, and southeast Asia	Size: Habitat: Diet:	VU
Bay cat	Catopuma badia (Gray, 1874)	island of Borneo	Size: Habitat: Diet:	EN
