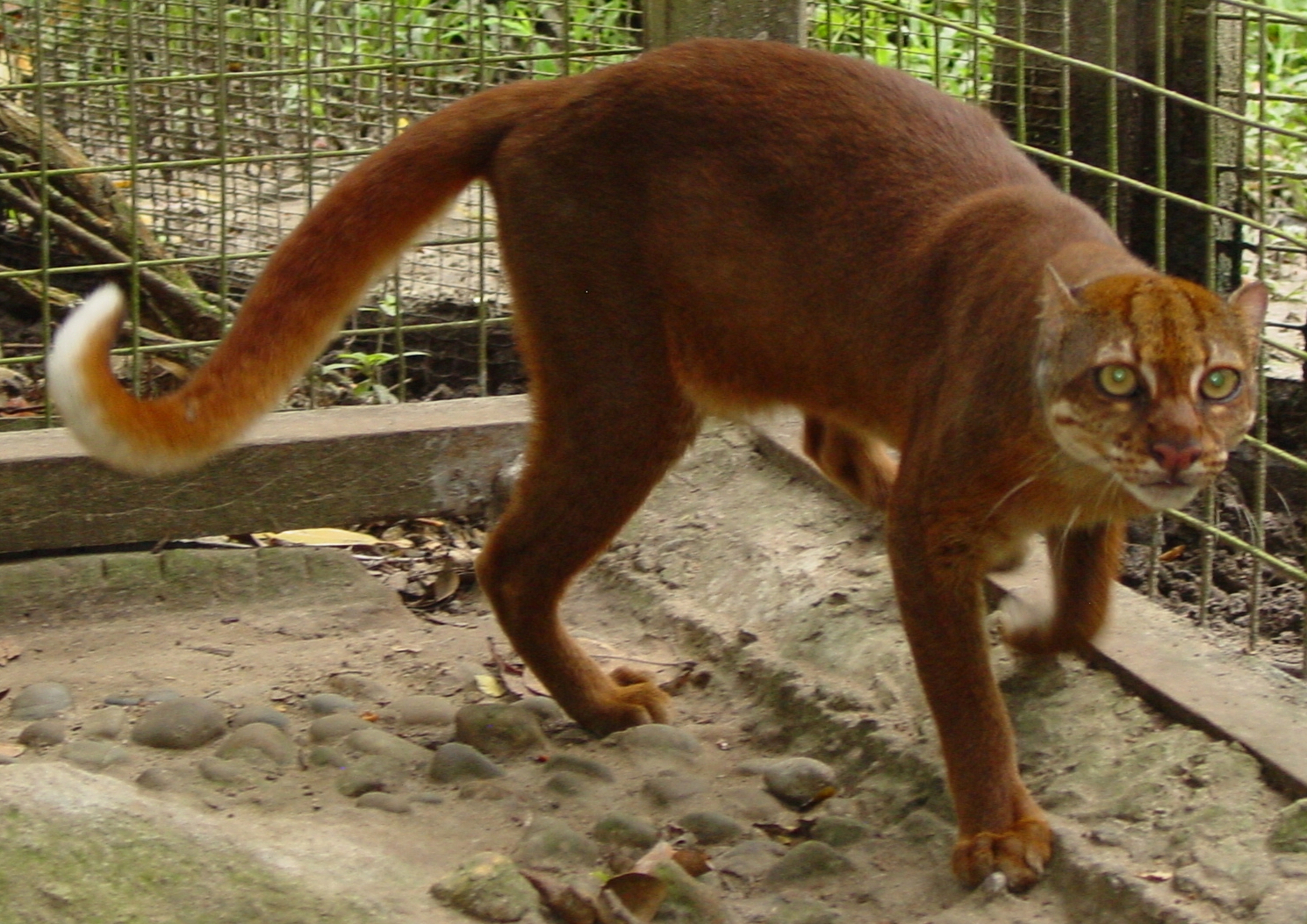

Conservation status
- Endangered (IUCN 3.1)
- CITES Appendix II

Scientific classification
- Kingdom: Animalia
- Phylum: Chordata
- Class: Mammalia
- Infraclass: Placentalia
- Order: Carnivora
- Family: Felidae
- Genus: Catopuma
- Species: C. badia

Binomial name
- Catopuma badia (Gray, 1874)
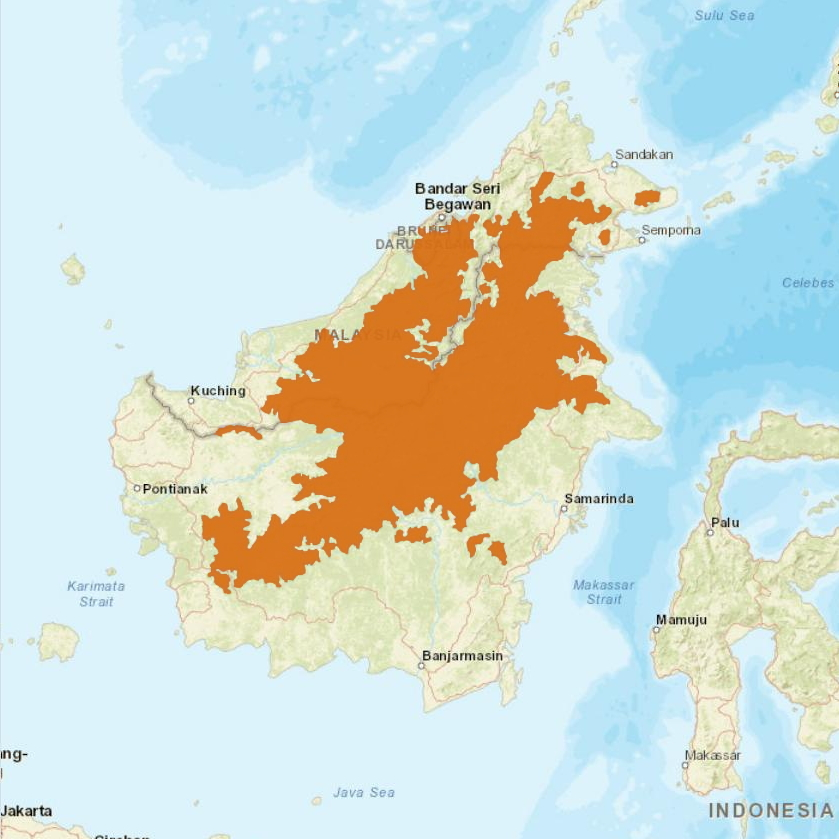
- Distribution of bay cat (2016)

Synonyms
- Felis badia Gray, 1874; Pardofelis badia (Gray, 1874)

= Bay cat =

Species of feline

The bay cat (Catopuma badia), also known as the Bornean bay cat, is a small wild cat endemic to the island of Borneo that appears to be relatively rare compared to sympatric wild cats, based on the paucity of historical, as well as recent records. Since 2002, it has been listed as Endangered on the IUCN Red List because it is estimated that fewer than 2,500 mature individuals exist, and that the population declined in the past. The bay cat has been recorded as rare and seems to occur at relatively low density, even in pristine habitats.

== Taxonomy and evolution ==
Felis badia was the scientific name proposed by John Edward Gray in 1874, who first described a bay cat skin and skull collected by Alfred Russel Wallace in 1856 in Sarawak. This cat was first thought to be a kitten of an Asian golden cat. In 1932, Reginald Innes Pocock placed the species in the monotypic genus Badiofelis. In 1978, it was placed in the genus Catopuma.

Tissue and blood samples were acquired only in late 1992 from the female brought to the Sarawak Museum. Morphological and genetic analysis confirmed the close relationship with the Asian golden cat, and that the two species had been separated from a common ancestor for 4.9 to 5.3 million years, long before the geological separation of Borneo from mainland Asia.

The bay cat's classification as Catopuma was widely recognized until 2006. Because of the evident close relationship of the bay cat and the Asian golden cat with the marbled cat, all three species were suggested in 2006 to be grouped in the genus Pardofelis.

== Characteristics ==
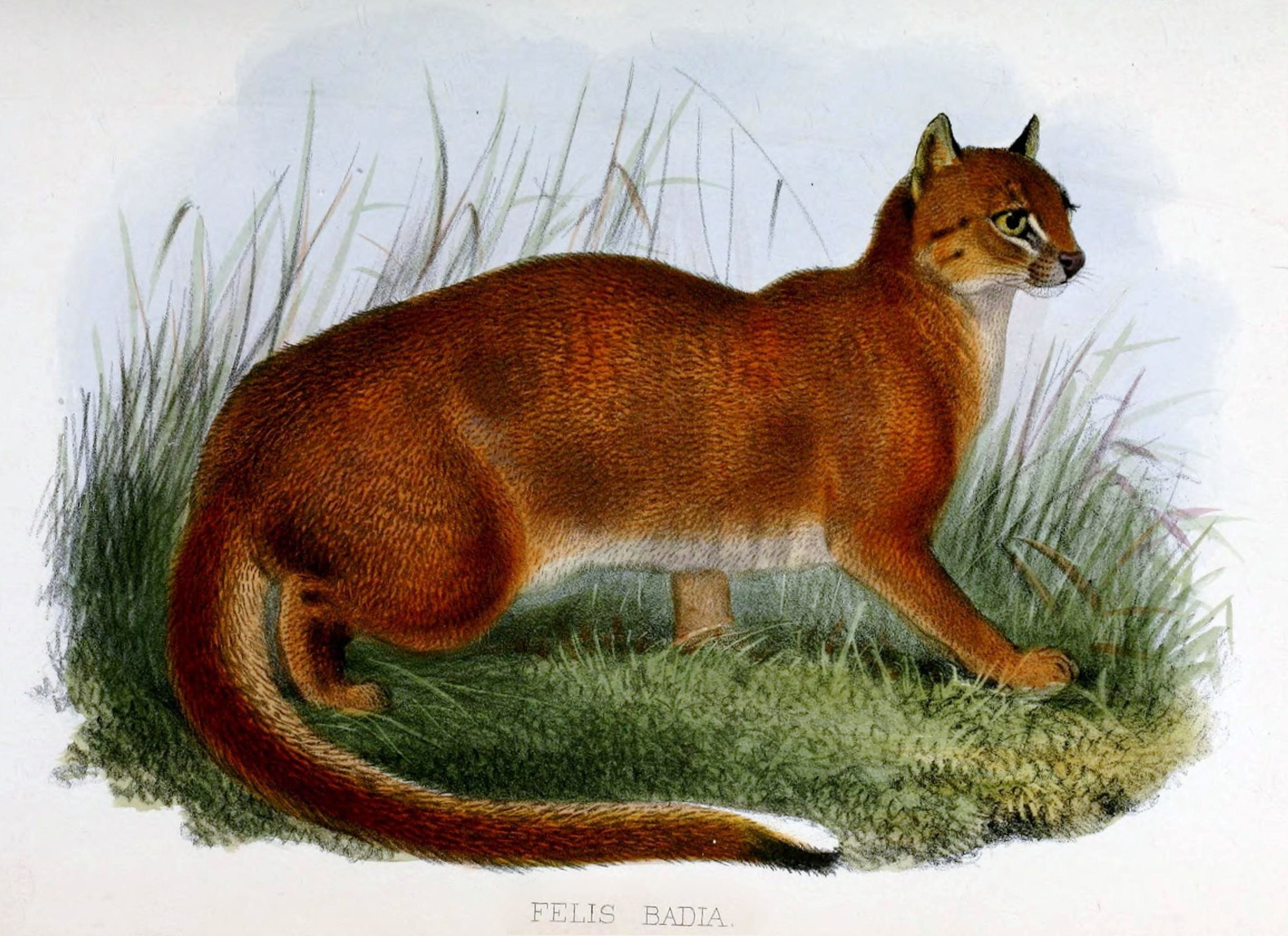
Illustration of a bay cat

The bay cat's fur is of a bright chestnut colour, but paler beneath, the limbs and the tail being rather paler and more reddish. The ears are rounded, covered with a short blackish-brown fur at the outer side, paler brown within and with a narrow brown margin. The tail is elongated and tapering at the end, with a white central streak occupying the rear half of the lower side, gradually becoming wider and of a purer white towards the tip, which has a small black spot at its upper end.

Its short, rounded head is dark greyish-brown with two dark stripes originating from the corner of each eye, and the back of the head has a dark M-shaped marking. The backs of the ears are dark greyish without any white spot. The underside of the chin is white, and two faint brown stripes are on the cheeks. In the years between 1874 and 2004, only 12 specimens were measured. Their head-to-body length varied from 49.5–67 cm (19.5–26.4 in) with 30–40.3 cm (11.8–15.9 in) long tails. They were estimated to have an adult weight of 3–4 kg (6.6–8.8 lb), but too few living specimens have been obtained to allow a more reliable estimate.

== Distribution and habitat ==
In the 19th century, only seven bay cat skins surfaced, and the first live female caught in 1992 on the Sarawak–Indonesian border was brought to the Sarawak Museum on the verge of death. In the mid-1990s, the most reliable sightings have been reported in Gunung Palung National Park and the upper Kapuas River in West Kalimantan. Two concentrations were reported in the island's interior at the time, in habitat types varying from swamp forests, lowland dipterocarp forest to hill forests up to at least 500 m (1,600 ft). One unconfirmed sighting occurred at 1,800 m (5,900 ft) on Mount Kinabalu. It inhabits dense tropical forests, and has been observed in rocky limestone outcrops and in logged forest, and close to the coast. At least three specimens were found near rivers, but this was probably due to collector convenience rather than evidence of habitat preference. In 2002, a bay cat was photographed in Sarawak's Gunung Mulu National Park. From 2003 to 2005, 15 single bay cats were observed in Sarawak, Sabah and Kalimantan, but none in Brunei. Almost all the historical and recent records are from close proximity to water bodies such as rivers and mangroves, suggesting the bay cat may be closely associated with such habitats.

In central Sarawak, only one individual was recorded in more than a year of camera trapping between August 2010 and November 2011 in an area that was regenerating from logging. Most records of the bay cat obtained in Sarawak between 2003 and 2018 were located in lowland riverine and montane forests below 700 m (2,300 ft); its occurrence increased at a distance of 10 km (6.2 mi) away from roads.

In Sabah, a camera trapping survey from July 2008 to January 2009 in the northwestern part of Deramakot Forest Reserve yielded one photo of a male bay cat in an area of about 112 km^{2} (43 sq mi) in a total survey effort of 1916 camera trap nights. This record expanded the known range of the bay cat to the north. Between May and December 2011, it was also recorded in the Kalabakan Forest Reserve, a highly-disturbed commercial forest reserve that had been logged between 1978 and the early 2000s; natural forest remains in an area of 2,240 km^{2} (860 sq mi), and large terrain is covered by an oil palm plantation and access roads. The bay cat was photographed off-trail in seven of eight records, indicating that it tends to avoid logged areas. A repeated survey in Kalabakan Forest Reserve in 2018 yielded records in just eight of 74 locations during more than 7,200 camera trap days. One individual was recorded in Danum Valley Conservation Area. Data from 578 camera trapping stations in eight forest reserves and two plantation sites in Sabah revealed that the bay cat inhabits core forest areas with no to little disturbance at elevations of 127–1,051 m (417–3,448 ft), but does not live in plantations.

In East Kalimantan, it was recorded in at elevations from 69 to 400 m (226 to 1,312 ft) in Kutai National Park, Wehea Protection Forest and Sungai Wain Protection Forest during surveys in 2012 and 2013. In Central Kalimantan, a single bay cat was recorded in a mosaic of heath and peat swamp forest in the Rungan River catchment area during surveys between 2016 and 2018. In 2023, the bay cat was again seen in Kayan Mentarang National Park in North Kalimantan through surveillance cameras installed by national park officials. Previously, in 2021 and 2022, routine patrols and camera traps were conducted but yielded no results. The last time a bay cat was seen in the area was in 2003 via surveillance cameras by Dave Augeri and the WWF Kayan Mentarang Project crews.

== Behavior and ecology ==
Bay cats recorded in Sabah exhibited a diurnal activity pattern with a peak in the morning and another peak in the early afternoon. Bay cats recorded in nine study areas in both protected and non-protected areas in Sarawak were also diurnal.

In Sarawak, a bay cat was allegedly observed on a branch 1 m (3 ft 3 in) from the ground close to the river during a night hunting expedition. Nothing is known about its diet and reproductive behavior.

== Threats ==
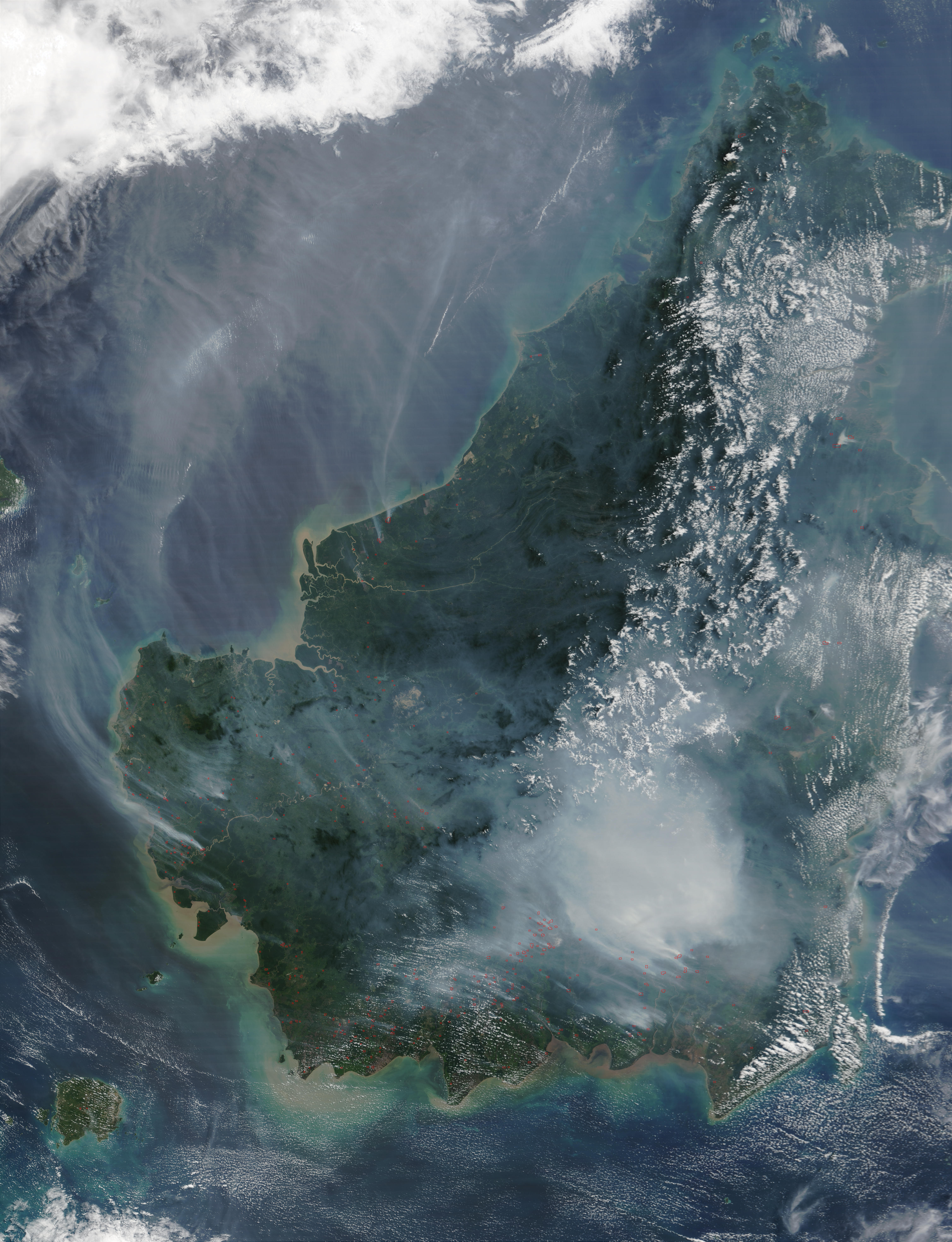
Satellite photo of Borneo showing smoke from burning peat swamp forests

The bay cat is forest-dependent and increasingly threatened by habitat destruction following deforestation in Borneo. Habitat loss due to commercial logging and conversion to oil palm plantations pose the greatest threat to the bay cat. Oil palm plantations are likely to expand in the future as a result of the push for biofuels. Borneo has one of the world's highest deforestation rates. While in the mid-1980s, forests still covered nearly three-quarters of the island, by 2005 only 52% of Borneo was still forested. Both forests and land make way for human settlement. Less than 6% of Indonesia's and Malaysia's land region is protected.

Poaching for the illegal wildlife trade also poses a significant threat. Bay cats have been captured in the wild for the trade as pets and skins.

== Conservation ==
The bay cat is listed on CITES Appendix II. It is fully protected by national legislation across most of its range. Hunting and trade are prohibited in Kalimantan, Sabah, and Sarawak. The bay cat remains one of the least studied of the world's wild cats, hampering the development of conservation actions.
