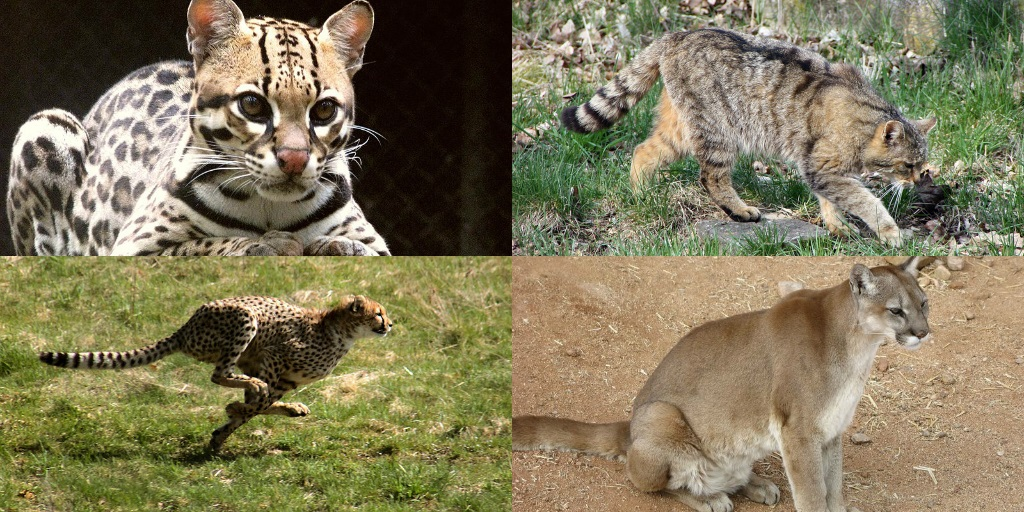
- Clockwise from top left: an ocelot, a European wildcat, a cougar and a cheetah

Scientific classification
- Kingdom: Animalia
- Phylum: Chordata
- Class: Mammalia
- Order: Carnivora
- Family: Felidae
- Subfamily: Felinae; Fischer von Waldheim, 1817

Type genus
- Felis Linnaeus, 1758

Genera
- See §Taxonomy
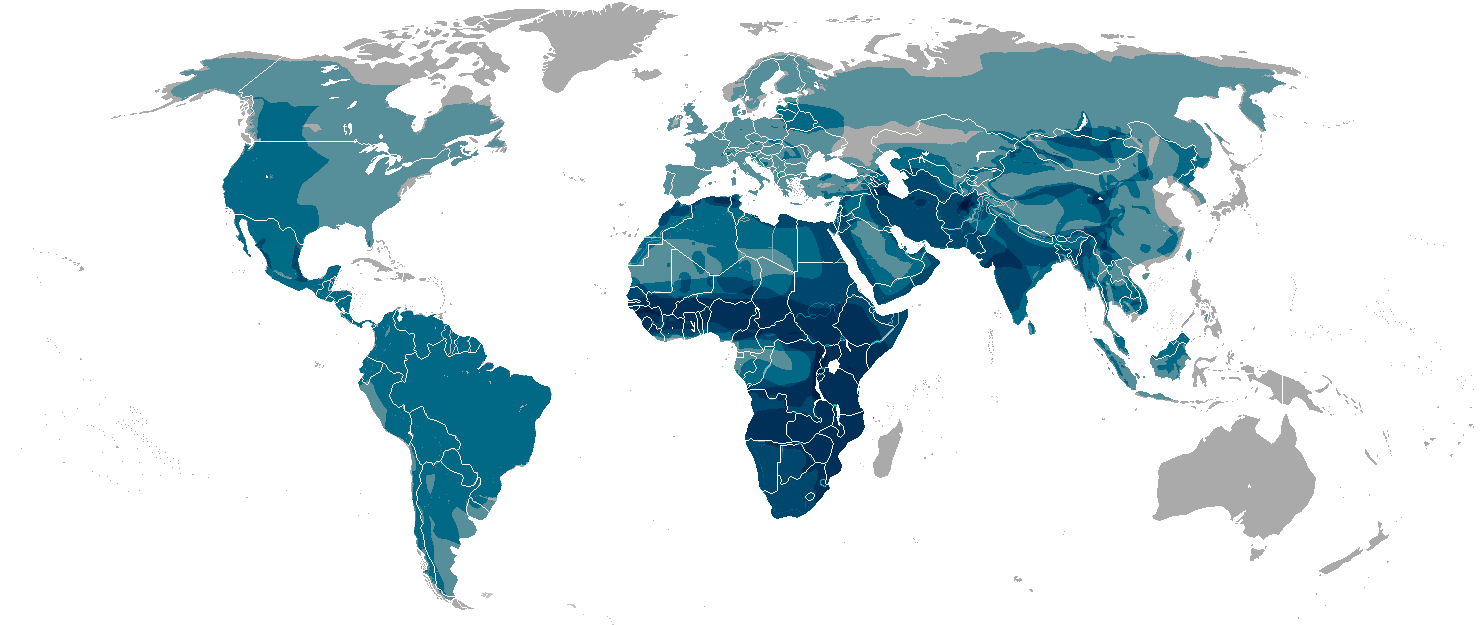
- Native ranges of Felinae

= Felinae =

Felinae Temporal range: Miocene–Holocene, 9–0 Ma

Subfamily of Felidae

The Felinae or small cats are a subfamily of the Felidae distinguished by a bony hyoid, because of which they can purr but not roar. Other authors have proposed an alternative definition for this subfamily, as comprising only the living conical-toothed cat genera, with two tribes, the Felini and Pantherini, and excluding the extinct sabre-toothed Machairodontinae.

== Characteristics ==
The members of the Felinae have retractile claws that are protected by at least one cutaneous lobe. Their larynx is kept close to the base of the skull by an ossified hyoid. They can purr owing to the vocal folds being shorter than 6 mm (0.24 in). The cheetah Acinonyx does not have cutaneous sheaths for guarding claws.

== Taxonomy ==
The term 'Felini' was first used in 1817 by Gotthelf Fischer von Waldheim, at the time for all the cat species that had been proposed as belonging to the genus Felis. In 1917, Reginald Innes Pocock also subordinated the following genera to the Felinae that had been proposed in the course of the 19th century: Lynx, Puma, Leptailurus, Prionailurus, Pardofelis, Leopardus, Herpailurus, Neofelis and four more.

The Felinae and Pantherinae probably diverged about 11.5 million years ago. The genera within the Felinae diverged between 10.67 and 4.23 million years ago.

Today, the following living genera and species are recognised as belonging to the Felinae:

Genus	Species	Image of type species	Range
Acinonyx Brookes, 1828	Cheetah (A. jubatus) Schreber, 1777		Africa and Southwestern Asia
Caracal Gray, 1843	Caracal (C. caracal) (Schreber, 1776); African golden cat (C. aurata) (Temminck, 1827)		Africa and Southwestern Asia
Catopuma Severtzov, 1858	Asian golden cat (C. temminckii) (Vigors & Horsfield, 1827); Bay cat (C. badia) (Gray, 1874)		Southeastern Asia
Felis Linnaeus, 1758	Domestic cat (F. catus) Linnaeus, 1758; European wildcat (F. silvestris) Schreber, 1777; Jungle cat (F. chaus) Schreber, 1777; African wildcat (F. lybica) Forster, 1780; Black-footed cat (F. nigripes) Burchell, 1824; Sand cat (F. margarita) Loche, 1858; Chinese mountain cat (F. bieti) Milne-Edwards, 1892		Afro-Eurasia; Worldwide (Domestic Cat)
Herpailurus Severtzov, 1858	Jaguarundi (H. yagouaroundi) (Geoffroy Saint-Hilaire, 1803)		Central and Southern America
Leopardus Gray, 1842	Ocelot (L. pardalis) (Linnaeus, 1758); Oncilla (L. tigrinus) (Schreber, 1775); Pampas cat (L. colocolo) (Molina, 1782); Kodkod (L. guigna) (Molina, 1782); Margay (L. wiedii) (Schinz, 1821); Geoffroy's cat (L. geoffroyi) (d'Orbigny & Gervais, 1844); Andean mountain cat (L. jacobitus) (Cornalia, 1865); Southern tiger cat (L. guttulus) (Hensel, 1872); Tilcayo (L. tilcayo) (Nogales-Ascarrunz et al., 2026)		Central and Southern America
Leptailurus Severtzov, 1858	Serval (L. serval) (Schreber, 1775)		Africa
Lynx Kerr, 1792	Eurasian lynx (L. lynx) (Linnaeus, 1758); Bobcat (L. rufus) (Schreber, 1777); Canada lynx (L. canadensis) Kerr, 1792; Iberian lynx (L. pardinus) (Temminck, 1827)		Northern Hemisphere
Otocolobus Brandt, 1842	Pallas's cat (O. manul) (Pallas, 1776)		Central Asia
Pardofelis Severtzov, 1858	Marbled cat (P. marmorata) (Martin, 1836)		Southeastern Asia
Prionailurus Severtzov, 1858	Leopard cat (P. bengalensis) (Kerr, 1792); Sunda leopard cat (P. javanensis) (Desmarest, 1816); Flat-headed cat (P. planiceps) (Vigors & Horsfield, 1827); Fishing cat (P. viverrinus) (Bennett, 1833); Rusty-spotted cat (P. rubiginosus) (Geoffroy Saint-Hilaire, 1834)		Southeastern and Eastern Asia
Puma Jardine 1834	Cougar (P. concolor) Linnaeus, 1771		Americas

=== Extinct taxa ===
Genus	Species	Image
Felis	Felis lunensis	
Acinonyx	A. aicha; A. intermedius; A. pardinensis	
Lynx	L. issiodorensis; L. rexroadensis; L. thomasi	
Puma	P. lacustris; P. pardoides; P. pumoides	
Leopardus	L. vorohuensis	
Leptofelis Salesa et al., 2017	L. vallesiensis	
Magerifelis Salesa et al., 2024	M. peignei	
Miracinonyx Adams, 1979	M. inexpectatus; M. trumani	
Pratifelis Hibbard, 1934	P. martini	
Pristifelis Salesa et al., 2012	P. attica	
Sivapanthera Kretzoi, 1929	S. arvernensis; S. brachygnathus; S. linxiaensis; S. padhriensis; S. pleistocaenicus; S. potens	
Sivapardus Bikr, 1969	S. punjabiensis	
Vishnufelis Pilgrim, 1932	V. laticeps	

=== Phylogeny ===
The phylogenetic relationships of Felinae are shown in the following cladogram (note that this includes the sensu lato definition, which encompasses Panthera and its relatives, but not the extinct machairodontines and others):

- Felinae sensu lato
  - Felinae sensu stricto
    - - - - - - Domestic cat lineage
                - Felis
                  - - - - - - - Felis catus (domestic cat)
                              - Felis lybica (African wildcat)
                            - Felis bieti (Chinese mountain cat)
                          - Felis silvestris (European wildcat)
                        - †Felis lunensis (Martelli's cat)
                      - Felis margarita (Sand cat)
                    - Felis nigripes (Black-footed cat)
                  - Felis chaus (Jungle cat)
                - †Pristifelis
                  †Pristifelis attica
              - Leopard cat lineage
                - Prionailurus
                  - - - Prionailurus bengalensis (Leopard cat)
                      - Prionailurus javanensis (Sunda leopard cat)
                      - Prionailurus viverrinus (Fishing cat)
                    - Prionailurus planiceps (Flat-headed cat)
                  - Prionailurus rubiginosus (Rusty-spotted cat)
                - Otocolobus
                  Otocolobus manul (Pallas's cat)
            - Puma lineage
              - - - Puma
                    - Puma concolor (Cougar)
                    - †Puma pardoides (Eurasian puma)
                    - †Puma pumoides
                  - †Miracinonyx
                    - †Miracinonyx inexpectatus
                    - †Miracinonyx trumani
                - Herpailurus
                  Herpailurus yagouaroundi (Jaguarundi)
              - - Acinonyx
                  - Acinonyx jubatus (Cheetah)
                  - †Acinonyx pardinensis (Giant cheetah)
                  - †Acinonyx aicha
                  - †Acinonyx intermedius
                - †Sivapanthera
                  - †Sivapanthera brachygnathus
                  - †Sivapanthera pleistocaenicus
                  - †Sivapanthera potens
                  - †Sivapanthera linxiaensis
                  - †Sivapanthera padhriensis
                  - †Sivapanthera arvernensis
          - Lynx
            Lynx lineage
            - - - - Lynx lynx (Eurasian lynx)
                  - Lynx pardinus (Iberian lynx)
                - Lynx canadensis (Canada lynx)
              - Lynx rufus (Bobcat)
            - †Lynx issiodorensis (Issoire lynx)
            - †Lynx rexroadensis
            - †Lynx thomasi
        - Leopardus
          Ocelot lineage
          - - Leopardus pardalis (Ocelot)
            - Leopardus wiedii (Margay)
          - - - Leopardus tigrinus (Oncilla)
              - - Leopardus guigna (Kodkod)
                - - Leopardus geoffroyi (Geoffroy's cat)
                  - Leopardus guttulus (Southern tiger cat)
            - - Leopardus colocolo (Pampas cat)
              - Leopardus jacobita (Andean mountain cat)
          - †Leopardus vorohuensis
      - Caracal lineage
        - Caracal
          - Caracal caracal (Caracal)
          - Caracal aurata (African golden cat)
        - Leptailurus
          Leptailurus serval (Serval)
    - Bay cat lineage
      - Catopuma
        - Catopuma badia (Bay cat)
        - Catopuma temminckii (Asian golden cat)
      - Pardofelis
        Pardofelis marmorata (Marbled cat)
    - †Pratifelis
      †Pratifelis martini
    - †Leptofelis
      †Leptofelis vallesiensis
  - - Pantherinae
    - †Miopanthera
      - †Miopanthera pamiri

== See also ==
- List of felids
