= Pratifelis =

Pratifelis Temporal range: Late Miocene

Scientific classification
- Kingdom: Animalia
- Phylum: Chordata
- Class: Mammalia
- Order: Carnivora
- Family: Felidae
- Subfamily: Felinae
- Genus: †Pratifelis; Hibbard, 1934

Type species
- †Pratifelis martini Hibbard, 1934

Synonyms
- Pseudaelurus martini sensu Macdonald, 1954

Extinct genus of carnivores

Pratifelis is an extinct genus of feline that lived in North America during the middle Miocene period. It contains a single species, Pratifelis martini.

== History and naming ==
In the summer of 1911, the first and only specimen was collected by H. T. Martin in Wallace County, Kansas. It was transported to the University of Kansas Museum of Vertebrate Paleontology, where it was named and described by paleontologist Claude W. Hibbard as a new genus and species of felid in 1934. The generic name Pratifelis comes from the Latin words pratum meaning field or plain, and felis, meaning cat. The specific name martini was given in honor of H. T. Martin.

In a 1954 paper J. R. Macdonald reassigned the species to the genus Pseudaelurus, but later papers maintained its status as a distinct and valid genus.

== Description ==
The single specimen upon which both the genus and species were based, UKMNH 3156, is a partial lower left ramus with only the third and fourth premolars and the first molar present. It has been noted for having fairly heavy dentition considering how light its jaw was.

P. martini was a short-faced cat, likely bigger than the modern cougar.

== Classification ==
In his description of the genus and species, Hibbard classified Pratifelis as a primitive member of Felidae, the cat family. L. D. Martin, in 1998, considered it part of the small cat subfamily Felinae.

A 2003 paper by Tom Rothwell, who had seen casts of the specimen, mentioned in passing that it had some similarity to specimens of Nimravides, and that an examination of the original specimen might result in a reassignment to that genus. And a 2018 phylogenetic analysis recovered Pratifelis martini within Nimravides:

- Felidae
  - - - - - - Felinae
            - Pantherinae
          - Pristifelis
        - Miopanthera
      - Styriofelis
    - Asilifelis coteae
    - - Machairodontinae
      - - Diamantofelis
        - Namafelis
        - Pseudaelurus
    - - Hyperailurictis validus
      - - Hyperailurictis skinneri
        - - - - Hyperailurictis intrepidus
              - Hyperailurictis stouti
            - Hyperailurictis marshi
          - - Nimravides pedionomus
            - Pratifelis martini
            - - Nimravides galiani
              - - Nimravides hibbardi
                - Nimravides thinobates
  - Proailurus
