= Sivapardus =

Sivapardus Temporal range: Late Pliocene-Early Pleistocene

Scientific classification
- Kingdom: Animalia
- Phylum: Chordata
- Class: Mammalia
- Order: Carnivora
- Family: Felidae
- Subfamily: Felinae
- Genus: †Sivapardus; Bakr, 1969

Type species
- Sivapardus punjabiensis Bakr, 1969
- Sar-Dhok locality (Punjab, Pakistan) Sar-Dhok locality (Pakistan)

Extinct genus of carnivores

Sivapardus is an extinct, little-known genus of feline with only one species assigned to it, Sivapardus punjabiensis. It was described in 1969 by the paleontologist Abu Bakr based on a partial mandible from the Upper Siwaliks in Pakistan; the locality it was found at is estimated to be from the Late Pliocene to Early Pleistocene. S. punjabiensis was a large cat with a short and broad snout that may have lived on open grasslands.

== History and naming ==
The type and only specimen, U.Z. No. 67/22 (part of the Punjab University Zoology Department Fossil Collection), was collected in 1967 from the Sar Dhok locality in the Pabbi Hills west of Kharain, Gujrat, in western Pakistan. It was described and assigned by Abu Bakr to the new genus and species Sivapardus punjabiensis in 1969. No etymology was given for either name.

== Description ==
The type specimen is a right mandibular ramus with several teeth: the fourth premolar and first molar are damaged but present, but only the roots of the third premolar and the canine tooth remain, and the third incisor is represented only by its tooth socket. The third incisor was situated a little in front of the canine tooth, which itself seems to have been relatively very large. The diastema behind the canine tooth was short. The shape of the third premolar, based on the roots, is typical of cats.

The fourth premolar, though damaged, resembles most felines in having three cusps in a row; the main cusp was likely slightly higher than the paraconid of the molar (similar to Panthera, not preserved in Sivapanthera), and a prominent posterior cingulum (a shelf at the base of the tooth) is located behind the posterior (rear) cusp (also similar to both Panthera and Sivapanthera); there is indication of a cingulum-like structure on the left and right of the anterior (front) cusp, but Bakr dismissed this as having any taxonomic value due to its small size. The first molar also retained enough of its structure for description: relative to the premolars, the anterior end is inclined towards the inside (like Panthera and unlike Acinonyx); the protoconid was longer and a cusp taller than the paraconid, with a deep valley between the two cusps; there is only faint indication of a talonid and no metaconid at all. The molar overall is longer than the fourth premolar, akin to Sivapanthera and unlike Panthera.

Bakr described the species as similar to Sivapanthera in general proportions, with the major difference being the masseteric fossa (the depression where the masseter muscle attaches to the jaw), which in Sivapanthera specimens extended to at least the hind end of the first molar, but in Sivapardus punjabiensis ended abruptly well before the first molar, and the end of the fossa was well-defined and deep; this feature also set it apart from Panthera and Acinonyx. The distinct shape of the masseteric fossa was given as the diagnostic feature of the genus and species.

Based on U.Z. No. 67/22, Bakr described Sivapardus punjabiensis as a cat with a short and broad snout similar to that of the cheetah-like Sivapanthera, larger in size than a leopard but smaller than a lion.

== Classification ==
Bakr classified Sivapardus as a feline, a member of the subfamily Felinae. This placement was followed by McKenna and Bell's 1997 book Classification of Mammals Above the Species Level.

== Paleoecology ==
The Sar-Dhok locality is estimated to be of Late Pliocene to late Early Pleistocene age, and may have been a savannah-like habitat, an open grasslands in a semi-arid climate, with denser growth along riverbanks. Other fauna known from the three Pabbi Hills localities (Sar-Dhok, Panjan Sher Shahana, and Kurla Sharif) are primarily herbivores and include proboscideans such as Elephas hysudricus, Elephas planifrons, and several species of Stegodon; the bovids Boselaphus namadicus, Proamphibos kashmiricus, Hemibos triquetricornis, Bos acutifrons, Bubalus palaeindicus, Bubalus platyceros, Kobus porrecticornis, Sivacobus patulicornis, Antilope sp., Sivatragus bohlini, Damalops and an indeterminate caprine; the cervids Metacervocerus punjabiensis and Rucervus; the giraffid Sivatherium giganteum; the hippopotamid Hexaprotodon sivalensis; rhinocerotids including Rhinoceros sivalensis, Rhinoceros sondaicus; and the equid Equus sivalensis.
