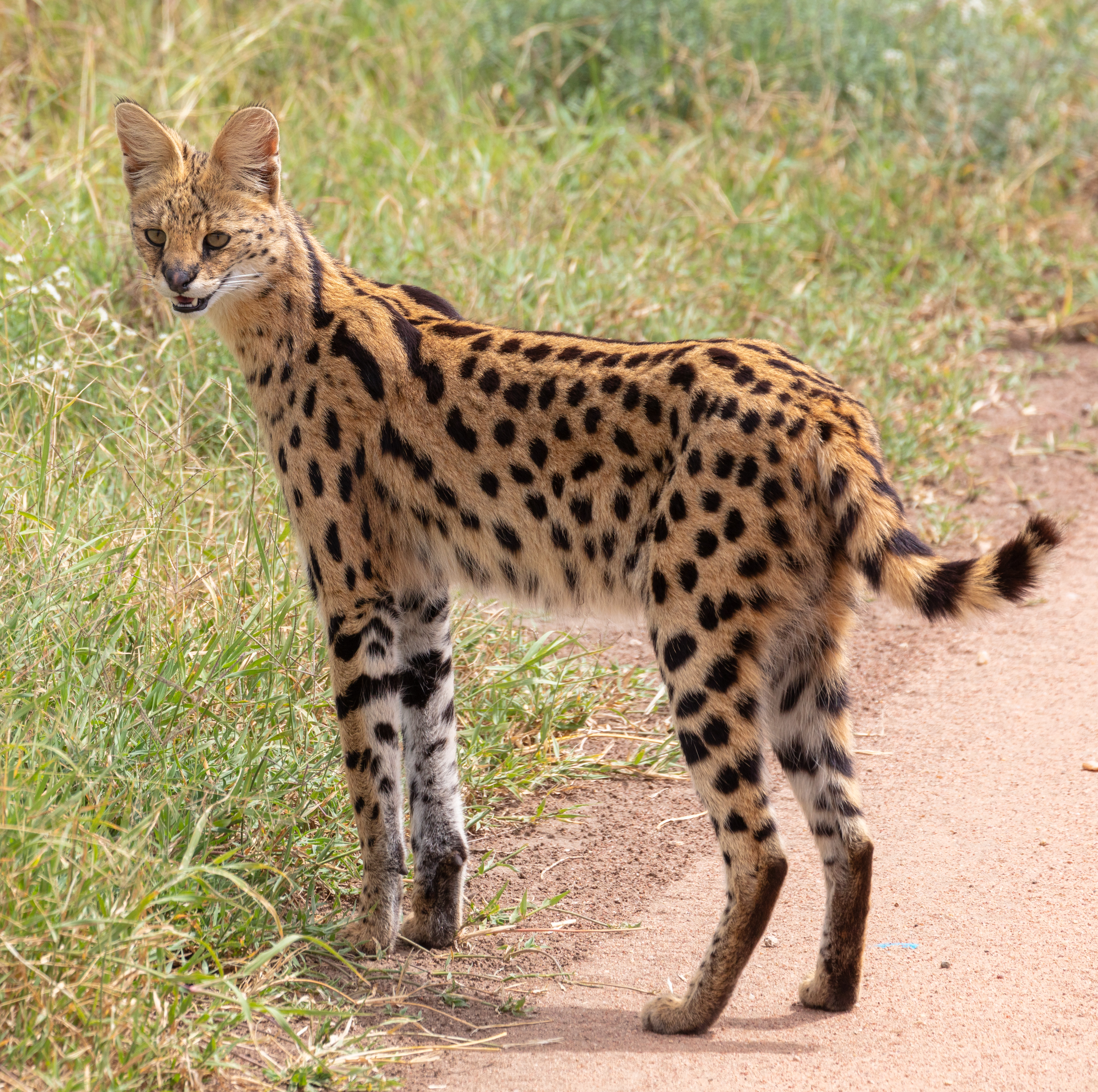
- In Tarangire National Park, Tanzania

Conservation status
- Least Concern (IUCN 3.1)
- CITES Appendix II

Scientific classification
- Kingdom: Animalia
- Phylum: Chordata
- Class: Mammalia
- Order: Carnivora
- Family: Felidae
- Subfamily: Felinae
- Genus: Leptailurus; Severtzov, 1858
- Species: L. serval

Binomial name
- Leptailurus serval (Schreber, 1776)

Subspecies
- L. s. serval; L. s. constantina; L. s. lipostictus
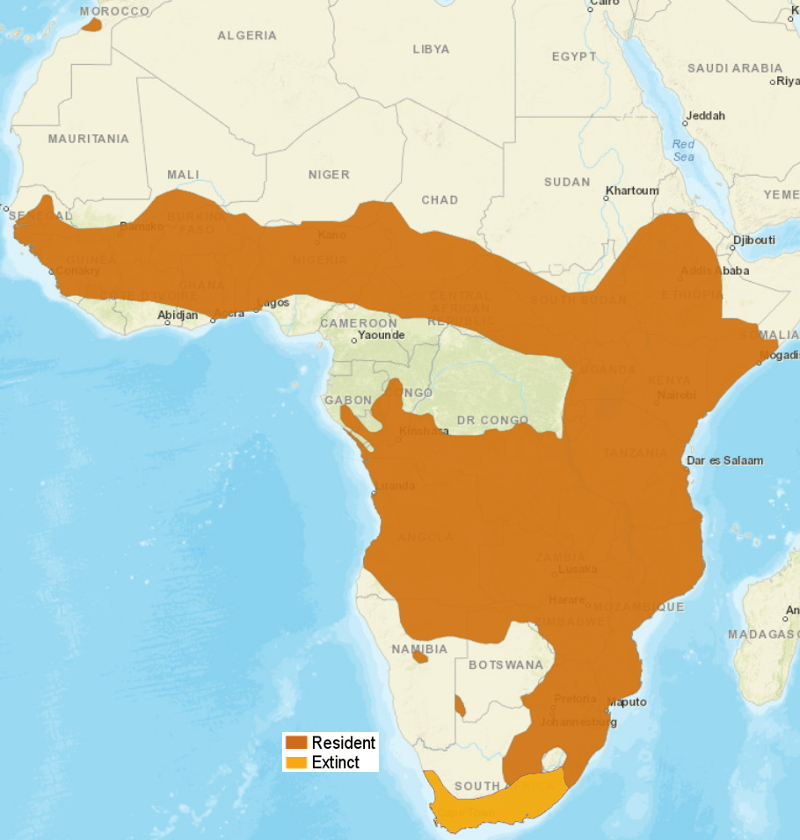
- native range in 2015 extinct

Synonyms
- List: Felis serval (Schreber, 1776); F. capensis (Forster, 1781); F. galeopardus (Desmarest, 1820); F. algiricus (J. B. Fischer, 1829); F. servalina (Ogilby, 1839); F. senegalensis (Lesson, 1839); F. ogilbyi (Schinz, 1844); Caracal serval

= Serval =

Medium-sized wild cat

The serval (Leptailurus serval) is a wild small cat native to Africa. It is widespread in sub-Saharan countries, where it inhabits grasslands, wetlands, moorlands and bamboo thickets. Across its range, it occurs in protected areas, and hunting it is either prohibited or regulated in range countries.

It is the sole member of the genus Leptailurus. Three subspecies are recognised. The serval is a slender, medium-sized cat that stands 54–62 cm (21–24 in) tall at the shoulder and has a weight range of approximately 9–18 kg (20–40 lb). It is characterised by a small head, large ears, a golden-yellow to buff coat spotted and striped with black, and a short, black-tipped tail. The serval has the longest legs of any cat relative to its body size.

The serval is a solitary carnivore and active both by day and at night. It preys on rodents, particularly vlei rats, small birds, frogs, insects, and reptiles, using its hearing to locate prey. It leaps over 2 m (6 ft 7 in) above the ground to land on the prey on its forefeet, and kills it with a bite to the neck or the head. Both sexes establish highly overlapping home ranges of 10 to 32 km^{2} (3.9 to 12.4 sq mi), and mark them with feces and saliva. Mating takes place at different times of the year in different parts of their range, but typically once or twice a year in an area. After a gestational period of two to three months, a litter of one to four kittens is born. They are weaned at the age of one month and begin hunting on their own at six months of age. They leave their mother at the age of around 12 months.

== Etymology ==
The name "serval" is derived from (lobo-) cerval, i.e., Portuguese for lynx, used by Georges-Louis Leclerc, Comte de Buffon in 1765 for a spotted cat that was kept at the time in the Royal Menagerie in Versailles; lobo-cerval is derived from Latin lupus cervarius, literally and respectively "wolf" and "of or pertaining to deer".

The name Leptailurus derives from the Greek λεπτός leptós meaning "fine, delicate", and αἴλουρος aílouros meaning "cat".

== Taxonomy ==
Felis serval was first described by Johann Christian Daniel von Schreber in 1776. In the 19th and 20th centuries, the following serval zoological specimens were described:

- Felis constantina proposed by Georg Forster in 1780 was a specimen from the vicinity of Constantine, Algeria.
- Felis servalina proposed by William Ogilby in 1839 was based on one serval skin from Sierra Leone with freckle-sized spots.
- Felis brachyura proposed by Johann Andreas Wagner in 1841 was also a serval skin from Sierra Leone.
- Felis (Serval) togoensis proposed by Paul Matschie in 1893 were two skins and three skulls from Togo.
- Felis servalina pantasticta and F. s. liposticta proposed by Reginald Innes Pocock in 1907 were based on one serval from Entebbe in Uganda with a yellowish fur, and one serval skin from Mombasa in Kenya with dusky spots on its belly.
- Felis capensis phillipsi proposed by Glover Morrill Allen in 1914 was a skin and a skeleton of an adult male serval from El Garef at the Blue Nile in Sudan.

The generic name Leptailurus was proposed by Nikolai Severtzov in 1858. The serval is the sole member of this genus.

In 1944, Pocock recognised three serval races in North Africa. Three subspecies are recognised as valid since 2017:

- L. s. serval, the nominate subspecies, in Southern Africa
- L. s. constantina in Central and West Africa
- L. s. lipostictus in East Africa

=== Phylogeny ===
The phylogenetic relationships of the serval have remained in dispute; in 1997, palaeontologists M. C. McKenna and S. K. Bell classified Leptailurus as a subgenus of Felis, while others like O. R. P. Bininda-Edmonds (of the Technical University of Munich) have grouped it with Felis, Lynx and Caracal. Studies in the 2000s and the 2010s show that the serval, along with the caracal and the African golden cat, forms one of the eight lineages of Felidae. According to a 2006 genetic study, the Caracal lineage came into existence 8.5 million years ago, and the ancestor of this lineage arrived in Africa 8.5–5.6 mya.

The phylogenetic relationships of the serval are as follows:

- - - Pardofelis
      Marbled cat (P. marmorata)
    - Catopuma
      - Bay cat (Catopuma badia)
      - Asian golden cat (Catopuma temminckii)
  - - - Caracal lineage
        - Leptailurus
          Serval (L. serval)
        - Caracal
          - Caracal (Caracal caracal)
          - African golden cat (Caracal aurata)
      - - Leopardus
        - - Lynx
          - - - Acinonyx
              - Puma
            - - - Otocolobus
                - Prionailurus
              - Felis

=== Hybrid ===
In April 1986, the first savannah cat, a hybrid between a male serval and a female domestic cat, was born; it was larger than a typical domestic kitten and resembled its father in its coat pattern. It appeared to have inherited a few domestic cat traits, such as tameness, from its mother. This cat breed may have a dog-like habit of following its owner about, is adept at jumping and leaping, and can be a good swimmer. Over the years it has gained popularity as a pet.

== Characteristics ==
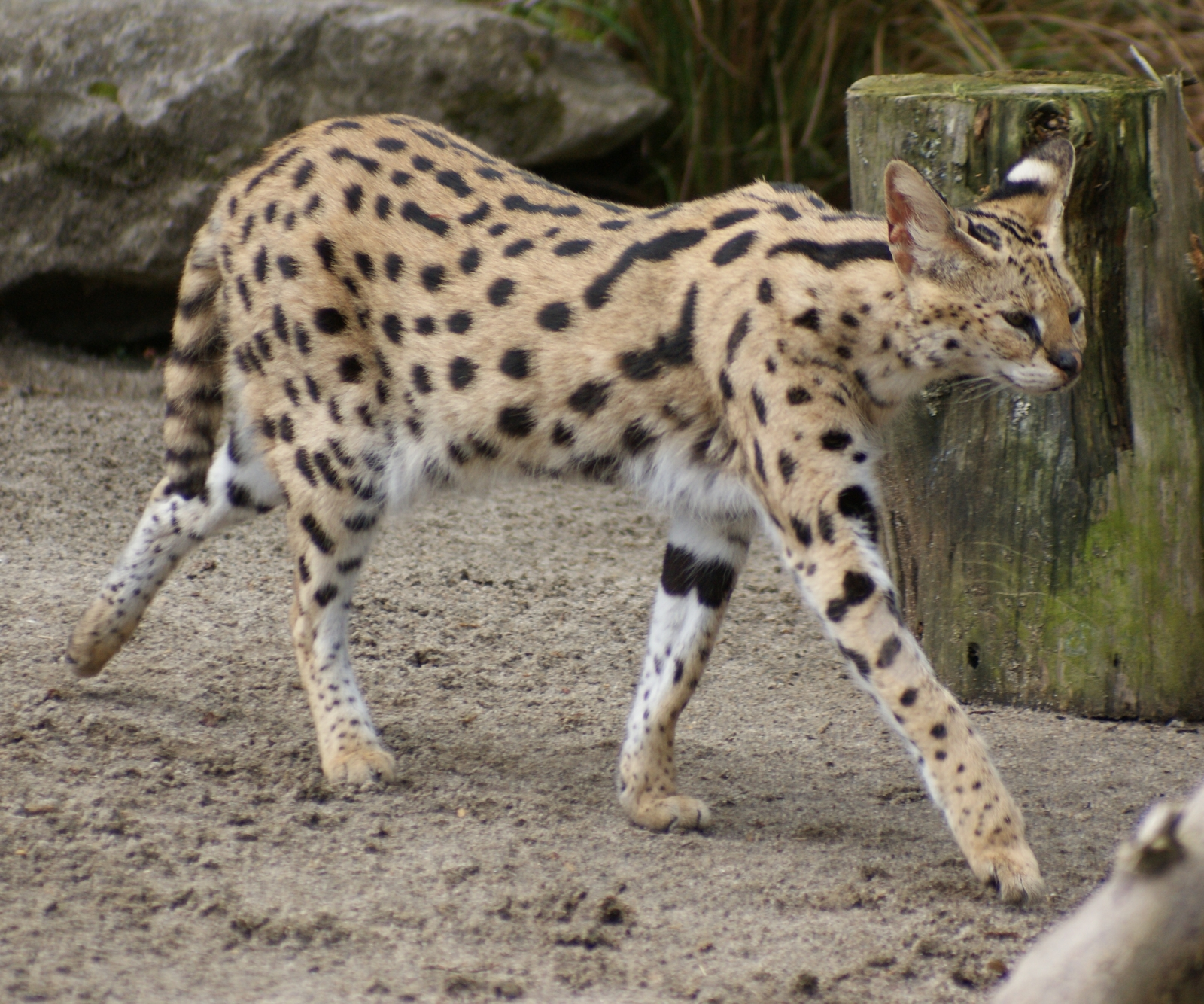
A captive serval in Auckland Zoo

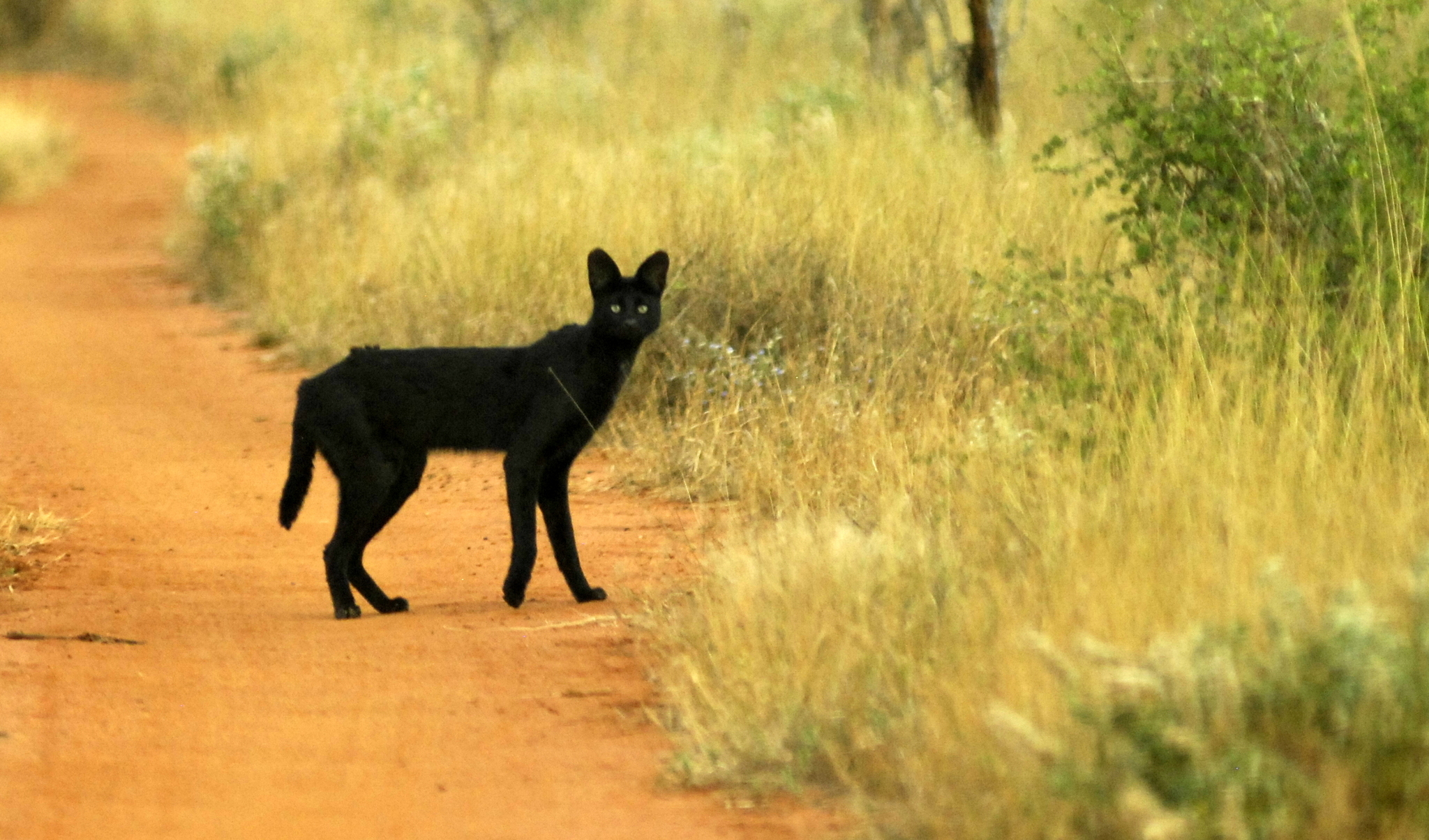
Melanistic serval, in Kenya

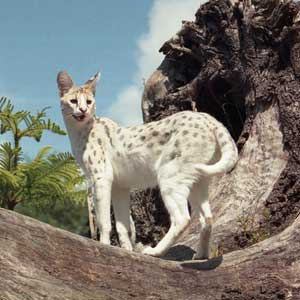
Leucistic serval at Big Cat Rescue

The serval is a slender, medium-sized cat; it stands 54 to 62 cm (21–24 in) at the shoulder and weighs 8 to 18 kg (18–40 lb), but females tend to be lighter. The head-and-body length is typically between 67 and 100 cm (26–39 in). Males tend to be sturdier than females. Prominent characteristics include the small head, large ears, spotted and striped coat, long legs and a black-tipped tail that is around 30 cm (12 in) long. The serval has the longest legs of any cat relative to its body size, largely due to the greatly elongated metatarsal bones in the feet. The toes are elongated as well, and unusually mobile.

The coat is golden-yellow to buff and extensively marked with black spots and stripes. The spots show great variation in size. Facial features include the whitish chin, spots, and streaks on the cheeks and the forehead, brownish or greenish eyes, white whiskers on the snout and near the ears, which are black on the back with a white horizontal band in the middle; three to four black stripes run from the back of the head onto the shoulders and then break into rows of spots. The white underbelly has dense and fluffy basal fur, and the soft guard hairs (the layer of fur protecting the basal fur) are 5–10 cm (2.0–3.9 in) long. Guard hairs are up to 3 cm (1.2 in) long on the neck, back and flanks, and are merely 1 cm (0.39 in) long on the face. The serval has a good sense of smell, hearing and vision.

The serval is similar to the sympatric caracal, but has a narrower spoor, a rounder skull, and lacks its prominent ear tufts. The closely set ears can rotate up to 180 degrees independently of each other and help in locating prey efficiently.

Both leucistic and melanistic servals have been observed in captivity. In addition, the melanistic variant has been sighted in the wild, with most melanistic servals having been observed in Kenya.

== Distribution and habitat ==
In North Africa, the serval is known only from Morocco and has been reintroduced in Tunisia, but is feared to be extinct in Algeria. It inhabits semi-arid areas and cork oak forests close to the Mediterranean Sea, but avoids rainforests and arid areas. It occurs in the Sahel, and is widespread in Southern Africa. It inhabits grasslands, moorlands, and bamboo thickets at high altitudes up to 3,800 m (12,500 ft) on Mount Kilimanjaro. It prefers areas close to water bodies such as wetland and savanna, which provide cover such as reeds and tall grasses. In the East Sudanian Savanna, it was recorded in the transboundary Dinder–Alatash protected area complex during surveys between 2015 and 2018.

In Zambia's Luambe National Park, the population density was recorded as 0.1/km^{2} (0.26/sq mi) in 2011. In South Africa, the serval was recorded in Free State, eastern Northern Cape, and southern North West. In Namibia, it is present in Khaudum and Mudumu National Parks.

== Behaviour and ecology ==
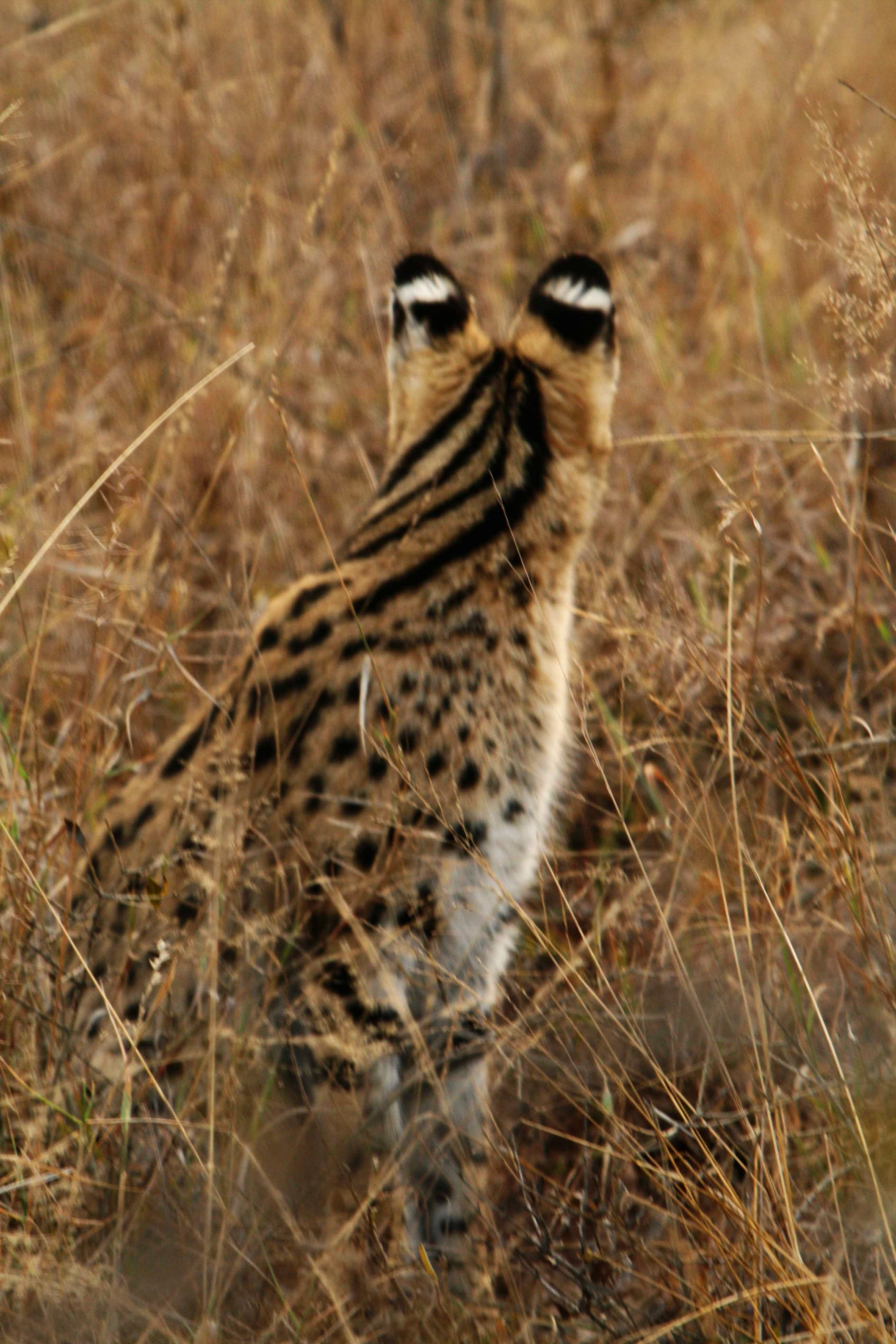
The serval's white spots on the backs of its ears are thought to play an important role in communication.

The serval is active both in the day and at night; activity might peak in early morning, around twilight, and at midnight. Servals might be active for a longer time on cool or rainy days. During the hot midday, they rest or groom themselves in the shade of bushes and grasses. Servals remain cautious of their vicinity, though they may be less alert when no large carnivores or prey animals are around. Servals walk as much as 2 to 4 km (1.2 to 2.5 mi) every night. Servals will often use special trails to reach certain hunting areas. A solitary animal, there is little social interaction among servals except in the mating season, when pairs of opposite sexes may stay together. The only long-lasting bond appears to be of the mother and her cubs, which leave their mother only when they are a year old.

Both males and females establish home ranges, and are most active only in certain regions ('core areas') within them. The area of these ranges can vary from 10 to 32 km^{2} (3.9 to 12.4 sq mi); prey density, availability of cover and human interference could be significant factors in determining their size. Home ranges might overlap extensively, but occupants show minimal interaction. Aggressive encounters are rare, as servals appear to mutually avoid one another rather than fight and defend their ranges. On occasions where two adult servals meet in conflict over territory, a ritualistic display may ensue, in which one will place a paw on the other's chest while observing their rival closely; this interaction rarely escalates into a fight.

Agonistic behavior involves vertical movement of the head (contrary to the horizontal movement observed in other cats), raising the hair and the tail, displaying the teeth and the white band on the ears, and yowling. Individuals mark their ranges and preferred paths by spraying urine on nearby vegetation, dropping scats along the way, and rubbing their mouths on grasses or the ground while releasing saliva. Servals tend to be sedentary, shifting only a few kilometres away even if they leave their range.

The serval is vulnerable to hyenas and African wild dogs. When threatened by a predator, it will seek cover to escape its view, and, if the predator is very close, immediately flee in long leaps, changing its direction frequently and with the tail raised. The serval is an efficient, though not frequent, climber; an individual was observed to have climbed a tree to a height of more than 9 m (30 ft) to escape dogs. Like many cats, the serval is able to purr; it also has a high-pitched chirp, and can hiss, cackle, growl, grunt, and meow.

=== Hunting and diet ===
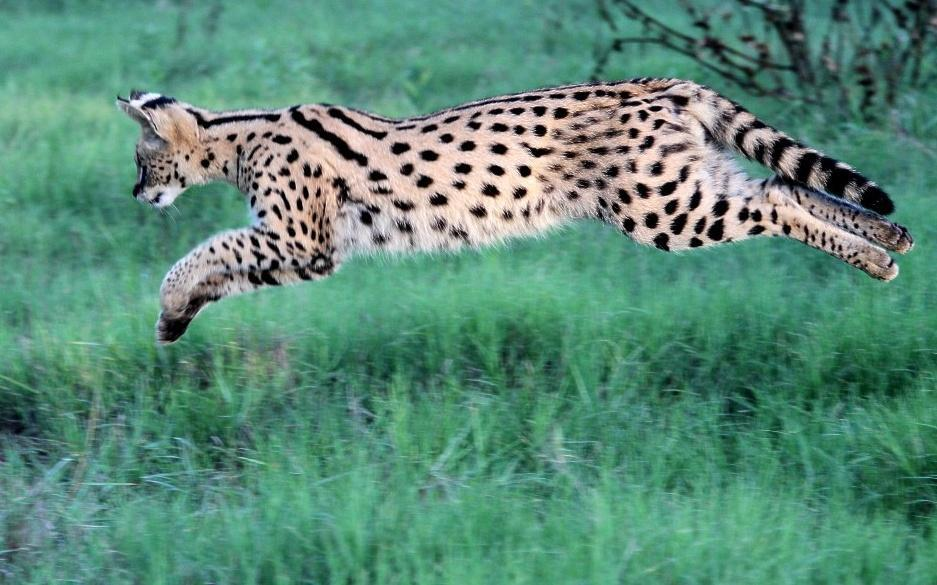
A serval pouncing

The serval is a carnivore that preys on rodents, particularly vlei rats, shrews, small birds, hares, frogs, insects, and reptiles, and also feeds on grass that can facilitate digestion or act as an emetic. Up to 90% of the preyed animals weigh less than 200 g (7.1 oz); occasionally it also hunts larger prey such as duikers, hares, flamingoes, spoonbills, waterfowl and young antelopes. The percentage of rodents in the diet has been estimated at 80–97%. Apart from vlei rats, other rodents recorded frequently in the diet include the African grass rat, African pygmy mouse and multimammate mice.

The serval locates prey by its strong sense of hearing. It remains motionless for up to 15 minutes; when prey is within range, it jumps with all four feet up to 4 m (13 ft) in the air and attacks with its front paws. To kill small prey, it slowly stalks it, then pounces on it with the forefeet directed toward the chest, and finally lands on it with its forelegs outstretched. The prey, receiving a blow from one or both of the serval's forepaws, is incapacitated, and the serval bites it on the head or the neck and immediately swallows it. Snakes are dealt more blows and even bites, and may be consumed even as they are moving. Larger prey, such as larger birds, are killed by a sprint followed by a leap to catch them as they are trying to flee, and are eaten slowly. Servals have been observed caching large kills to be consumed later by concealing them in dead leaves and grasses. Servals typically get rid of the internal organs of rodents while eating, and pluck feathers from birds before consuming them. During a leap, a serval can reach more than 2 m (6 ft 7 in) above the ground and cover a horizontal distance of up to 3.6 m (11 ft 10 in). Servals appear to be efficient hunters; a study in Ngorongoro showed that servals were successful in half of their hunting attempts, regardless of the time of hunting, and a mother serval was found to have a success rate of 62%. The number of kills in a 24-hour period averaged 15 to 16. Scavenging has been observed, but very rarely.

=== Reproduction ===
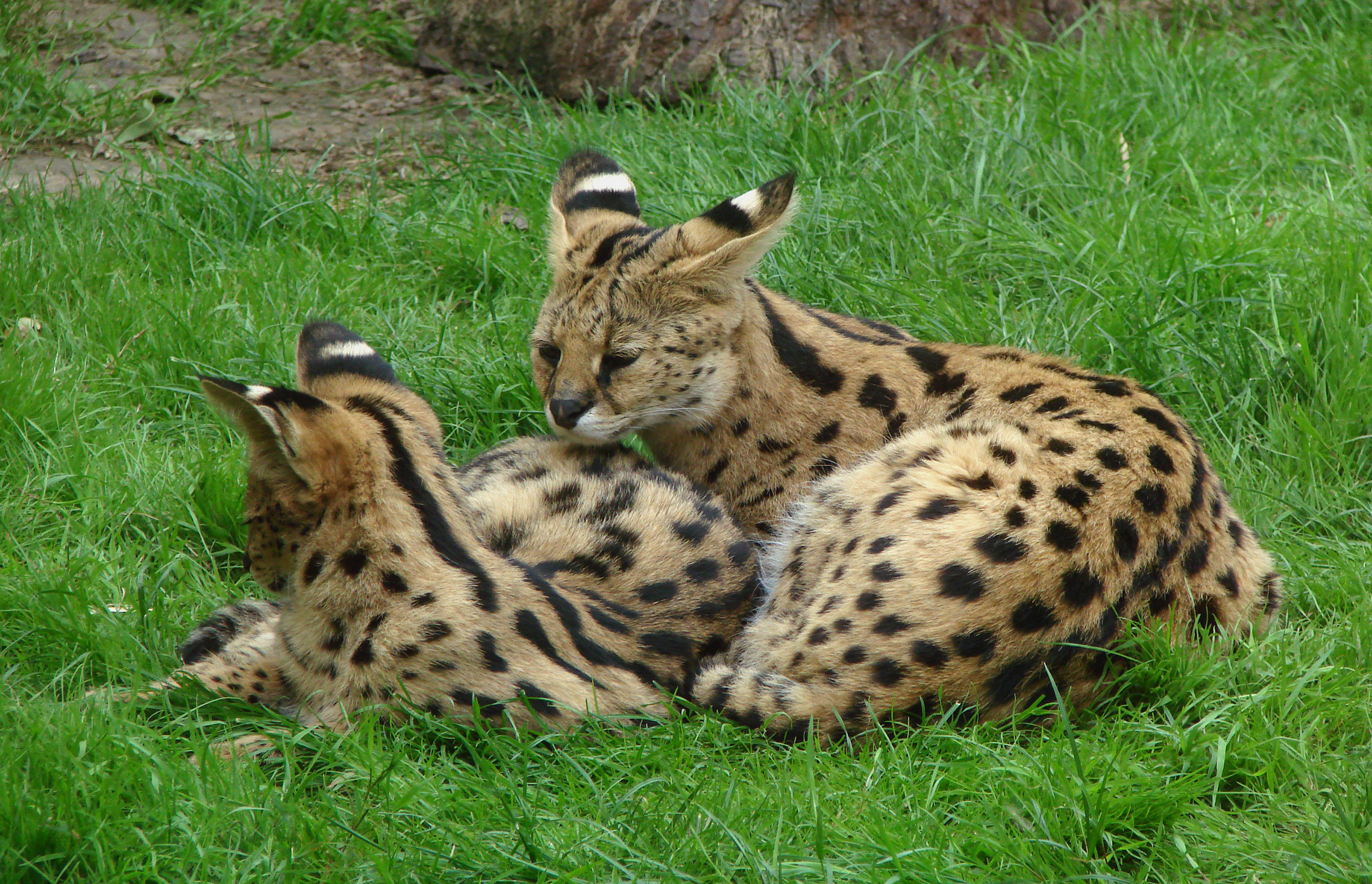
Two young servals

Both sexes become sexually mature when they are one to two years old. Oestrus in females lasts one to four days; it typically occurs once or twice a year, though it can occur three or four times a year if the mother loses her litters. Observations of captive servals suggest that when a female enters oestrus, the rate of urine-marking increases in her as well as the males in her vicinity. Zoologist Jonathan Kingdon described the behavior of a female serval in oestrus in his 1997 book East African Mammals. He noted that she would roam restlessly, spray urine frequently holding her vibrating tail in a vertical manner, rub her head near the place she has marked, salivate continuously, give out sharp and short "miaow"s that can be heard for quite a distance, and rub her mouth and cheeks against the face of an approaching male. The time when mating takes place varies geographically; births peak in winter in Botswana, and toward the end of the dry season in the Ngorongoro Crater. A trend generally observed across the range is that births precede the breeding season of murid rodents.

Gestation lasts for two to three months, after which a litter of one to four kittens is born. Births take place in secluded areas, for example in dense vegetation or burrows abandoned by aardvarks and porcupines. Blind at birth, newborns weigh nearly 250 g (9 oz) and have soft, woolly hair (greyer than in adults) and unclear markings. The eyes open after nine to thirteen days. Weaning begins a month after birth; the mother brings small kills to her kittens and calls out to them as she approaches the "den". A mother with young kittens rests for a notably lesser time and has to spend almost twice the time and energy for hunting than do other servals. If disturbed, the mother moves her kittens one by one to a safer place. Kittens eventually start accompanying their mother to hunts. At around six months, they acquire their permanent canines and begin to hunt themselves; they leave their mother at about 12 months of age. They may reach sexual maturity from 12 to 25 months of age. Life expectancy is about 10 years in the wild and up to 20 years in captivity.

== Conservation ==
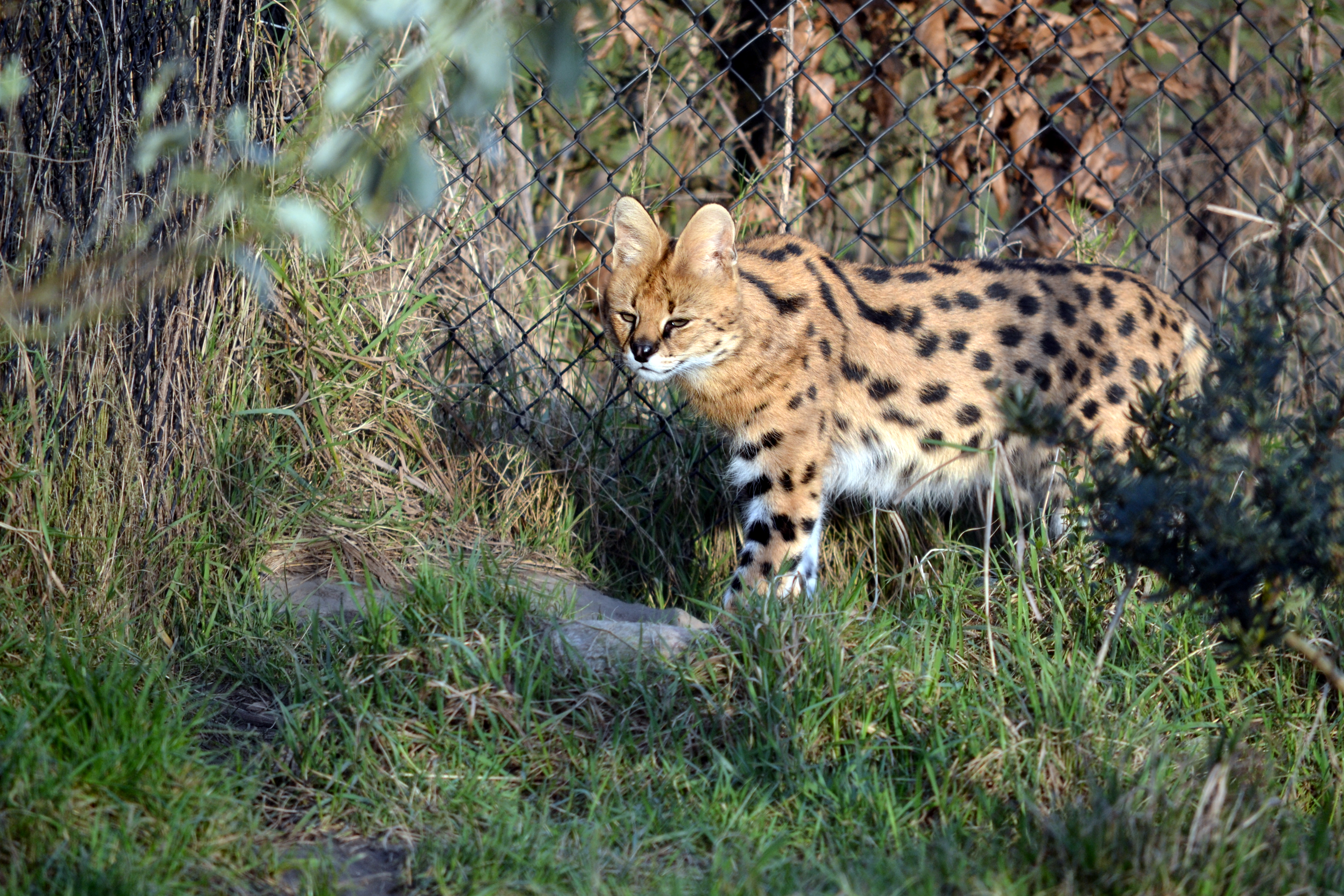
A serval in Diergaarde Blijdorp

The degradation of wetlands and grasslands is a major threat to the survival of the serval. Trade of serval skins, though on the decline, still occurs in countries such as Benin and Senegal. In West Africa, the serval has significance in traditional medicine. Pastoralists often kill servals to protect their livestock, though servals generally do not prey on livestock.

The serval is listed as least concern on the IUCN Red List, and is included in CITES Appendix II. It occurs in several protected areas across its range. Hunting of servals is prohibited in Algeria, Botswana, Congo, Kenya, Liberia, Morocco, Mozambique, Nigeria, Rwanda, Tunisia, and South Africa's Cape Province; hunting regulations apply in Angola, Burkina Faso, Central African Republic, the Democratic Republic of the Congo, Ghana, Malawi, Senegal, Sierra Leone, Somalia, Tanzania, Togo, and Zambia.

== In culture ==
The association of servals with human beings dates to the time of Ancient Egypt. Servals are depicted as gifts or traded objects from Nubia in Egyptian art.

Servals are occasionally kept as pets, although their wild nature means that ownership of servals is regulated in some countries. Servals can also be crossed with domestic cats to produce the savannah cat breed.
