= Vishnufelis =

Vishnufelis Temporal range: Miocene

Scientific classification
- Kingdom: Animalia
- Phylum: Chordata
- Class: Mammalia
- Order: Carnivora
- Family: Felidae
- Subfamily: Felinae
- Genus: †Vishnufelis; Pilgrim, 1932

Type species
- Vishnufelis laticeps Pilgrim, 1932

Genus of mammals (fossil)

Vishnufelis is a fossil genus of feline (cat) containing only a single species, Vishnufelis laticeps. It was described by Guy Ellcock Pilgrim in 1932, based on the first cranial material of a cat found in Asia: a fragmented skull found in the Chinji Formation, which dates back to the middle Miocene.

== History and naming ==
The holotype and only specimen, a fragmentary skull, was collected by K. Aiyengar from the Chinji Formation, some 2.75 miles (4.43 km) east of Paridarwaza in Jhelum, India. The fossils were placed in the collection in Calcutta of the Geological Survey of India, listed as GSI-D 266. In 1932, paleontologist Guy Ellcock Pilgrim described the fossils as the new genus and species Vishnufelis laticeps.

No etymology for the generic or specific names was given by Pilgrim, but the specific name laticeps, meaning "wide-headed" in Latin, is a common taxonomic epithet.

In 1978, additional fossils of Vishnufelis sp. were reported, though not described, from the upper Lower Siwaliks in the Ramnagar basin.

== Description ==
Pilgrim described it as a primitive feline of medium size with a low, elongated skull. The nasals are short and narrow, while the zygomatic arches are broad. The second premolar was very small and situated halfway between the canine and third premolar. The third premolar was likewise reduced. At least three incisors and the fourth premolar are preserved in the fossil. He considered it most similar to the clouded leopard among extant cats. Colbert, in his 1935 summary of Siwalik fossils, described it as small.

== Classification ==
Pilgrim in his original description considered Vishnufelis laticeps a very primitive member of the subfamily Felinae.

A 2025 book about Siwalik fossil species listed V. laticeps as one of several taxa of uncertain status and called the validity of the species into question.

== Paleobiology ==
Vishnufelis had sharp teeth and probably preyed on smaller animals.

== Paleoenvironment ==
The Lower Siwaliks of Ramnagar were likely a half-closed, half-open woodlands ecosystem with grassy areas, riddled with waterways and floodplain channels and ponds.

A 2020 analysis of carnivoran species considered it part of a Middle Miocene paleobiogeographic province in southern Asia.
