= Lynx hei =

Lynx hei Temporal range: Pliocene–Pleistocene

Scientific classification
- Kingdom: Animalia
- Phylum: Chordata
- Class: Mammalia
- Infraclass: Placentalia
- Order: Carnivora
- Family: Felidae
- Genus: Lynx
- Species: †L. hei

Binomial name
- †Lynx hei Jiangzuo et al., 2022

Extinct species of lynx

Lynx hei is an extinct fossil species of lynx. It was described in 2022 based on Plio-Pleistocene-aged fossils found in China. The cranium was found in Longdan, Linxia Basin, and is much smaller than the crania of Lynx issiodorensis found in the same locality. The fossil material is located in Hezheng Paleozoological Museum. It is phylogenetically similar to the modern North American bobcat.
