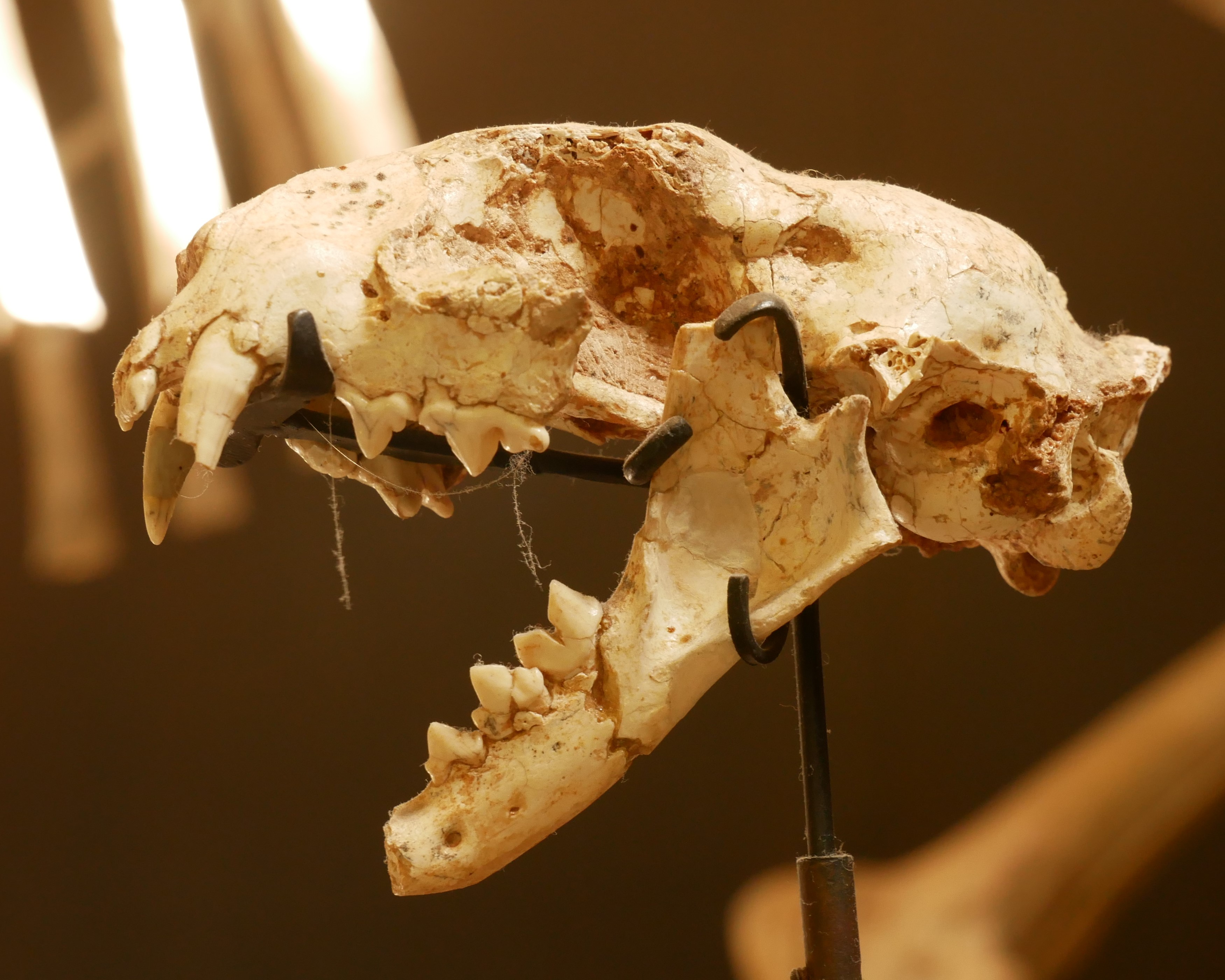
- Skull of Pristifelis attica

Scientific classification
- Kingdom: Animalia
- Phylum: Chordata
- Class: Mammalia
- Order: Carnivora
- Family: Felidae
- Genus: †Pristifelis; Salesa et al., 2012
- Species: †P. attica

Binomial name
- †Pristifelis attica (Wagner, 1857)

Synonyms
- Felis attica Wagner, 1857

= Pristifelis =

Pristifelis Temporal range: late Miocene 9–6 Ma

Extinct genus of carnivore

Pristifelis is an extinct genus of feline from the late Miocene. It contains a single species, Pristifelis attica. The first fossil skull of P. attica was excavated near Pikermi in Attica, Greece. Fossils were also excavated near the Moldovan city of Taraclia. It was also discovered in Maragheh, northwestern Iran. P. attica was bigger in body size than a European wildcat but probably smaller than a serval. The species was first described as Felis attica by Johann Andreas Wagner in 1857. Due to size differences, it was proposed as type species for the genus Pristifelis proposed in 2012.

Pristifelis attica was formerly considered ancestral to Felis, but is now considered ancestral to Felinae more broadly.

== History and naming ==
The generic name Pristifelis is a combination of the Latin pristinus meaning "primitive", and felis meaning "cat".
