= Leopardus vorohuensis =

Leopardus vorohuensis Temporal range: Early-Mid Pleistocene (Uquian)

Scientific classification
- Domain: Eukaryota
- Kingdom: Animalia
- Phylum: Chordata
- Class: Mammalia
- Order: Carnivora
- Suborder: Feliformia
- Family: Felidae
- Subfamily: Felinae
- Genus: Leopardus
- Species: †L. vorohuensis

Binomial name
- †Leopardus vorohuensis (Berta, 1983)

Synonyms
- Felis vorohuensis Berta, 1983

Extinct species of felid

Leopardus vorohuensis is an extinct species of feline. Fossils of the species were found in the Vorohué Formation of Argentina and dated to the Uquian age of the early middle Pleistocene. It is the earliest known cat of the ocelot lineage of neotropical cats.

== Taxonomy ==
Leopardus vorohuensis was originally described in 1983 by paleontologist Annalisa Berta, who placed it as a member of the genus Felis. It was later assigned to the genus Leopardus by the paleontologist John Alroy after a comparative study of various feline fossil species.
