= Sivapanthera =

Sivapanthera Temporal range: Pliocene-Pleistocene

Scientific classification
- Kingdom: Animalia
- Phylum: Chordata
- Class: Mammalia
- Order: Carnivora
- Family: Felidae
- Subfamily: Felinae
- Genus: †Sivapanthera; Kretzoi, 1929

Type species
- Sivapanthera brachygnathus (Lydekker, 1884)

Other Species
- Sivapanthera potens (Pilgrim, 1932); Sivapanthera linxiaensis Qiu et al., 2004

Synonyms
- Genus synonymy: Abacinonyx Kretzoi, 1929b; Sivafelis Pilgrim, 1932; Synonyms of S. potens: Sivafelis potens Pilgrim, 1932; Synonyms of S. brachygnathus: Felis (?Cynaelurus) brachygnatha Lydekker, 1884; Cynaeulurus brachygnathus sensu Pilgrim, 1910; Felis brachygnatha sensu Matthew, 1929; Acinonyx brachygnathus sensu Kretzoi, 1929a; Acinonyx lydekkeri Kretzoi, 1929a; Abacinonyx brachygnathus sensu Kretzoi, 1929b; Sivafelis brachygnathus sensu Pilgrim, 1932

Extinct genus of felid

Sivapanthera is a prehistoric genus of felid described by Kretzoi in 1929. Species of Sivapanthera are closely related to the modern cheetah but differ from modern cheetahs by having relatively longer brain cases, flatter foreheads, narrower nostrils and larger teeth. In many ways, skulls of Sivapanthera show similarity to those of the puma, or even those of Panthera. Scholars differ on the validity of this genus, while some think that it should be treated as a distinct genus, others think that its members should be treated as members of the Acinonyx genus, or even as subspecies of Acinonyx pardinensis.

== History of taxonomy ==
In 1884, Lydekker described two rami from the Pinjor Formation of Upper Siwaliks(most likely from Yamuna region) as Felis (?Cynaelurus) brachygnatha. Later, in 1925, Zdansky described Cynailurus pleistocaenicus based on fossils from Shansi, China.

In 1929, Hungarian palaeontologist Miklos Kretzoi described several new genera and species: in one paper he re-assigned Felis (Cynaelurus) brachygnatha as Acinonyx brachygnathus, re-described one of its two referred specimens as the new genus and species Sivapanthera lydekkeri; then in a second paper, he described the genus Abacinonyx for Cynailurus pleistocaenicus (the type species) and Felis (Cynaelurus) brachygnathus.

Also in 1929, American paleontologist W. D. Matthews made a review of Siwalik mammals in which he considered Cynailurus pleistoceanicus a junior synonym of Felis brachygnatha, which was also very similar to Felis arvernensis.

Guy Ellcock Pilgrim, in 1932, described a new genus Sivafelis, with the new species Sivafelis potens as the type species based on fossils collected from Moginand of northern India with additional referred material from Salt Range and also including Felis (?Cynaelurus) brachygnatha (=Sivafelis brachygnathus, and including Sivapanthera lydekkeri as a synonym) and Cynailurus pleistocaenicus (=Sivafelis pleistocaenicus). He admitted that both Abacinonyx and Sivapanthera were older, but stated that the confusion around the type species- Sivapanthera was the senior-most name but its type species was a junior synonym of Abacinonyx' type- compelled him to name a new genus. Colbert Edwin, in his review of Siwalik mammals, followed Pilgrim's assignment of Sivafelis brachygnathus and Sivafelis potens. But Simpson in 1945 noted that Sivapanthera was the senior and thus correct name for the genus, rendering Sivafelis and Abacinonyx junior synonyms.

A fourth species, Sivapanthera linxiaensis from Early Pleistocene deposits in China's Dongxiang Autonomous County, was described in 2004.

The status of Sivapanthera species is unresolved, with some researchers considering them all junior synonyms of Acinonyx pardinensis, subspecies of A. pardinensis, species in the genus Acinonyx, or belonging to the genus Sivapanthera is various states of synonymy with each other. One paper has suggested in passing that S. potens is a synonym of S. brachygnathus, while another paper stated that "S." potens was unlikely to belong to the same genus and was, in fact, more similar to Panthera uncia and Panthera onca. In 2024, S. pleistocaenicus was reclassified as a new species of Acinonyx.
