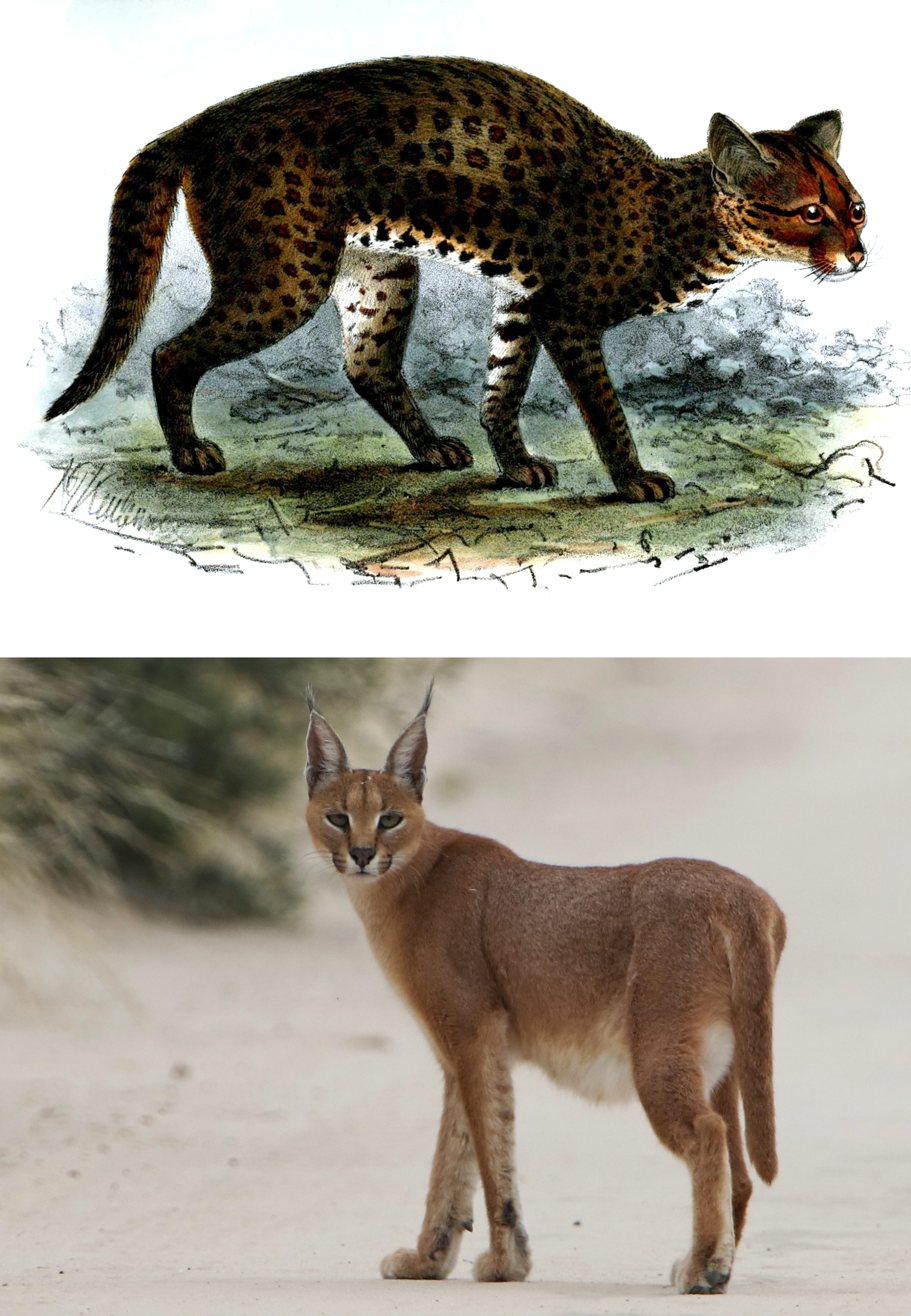
- African golden cat (C. aurata); Caracal (C. caracal)

Scientific classification
- Kingdom: Animalia
- Phylum: Chordata
- Class: Mammalia
- Infraclass: Placentalia
- Order: Carnivora
- Family: Felidae
- Subfamily: Felinae
- Genus: Caracal; Gray, 1843

Type species
- Caracal melanotis Gray, 1843

Species
- See text
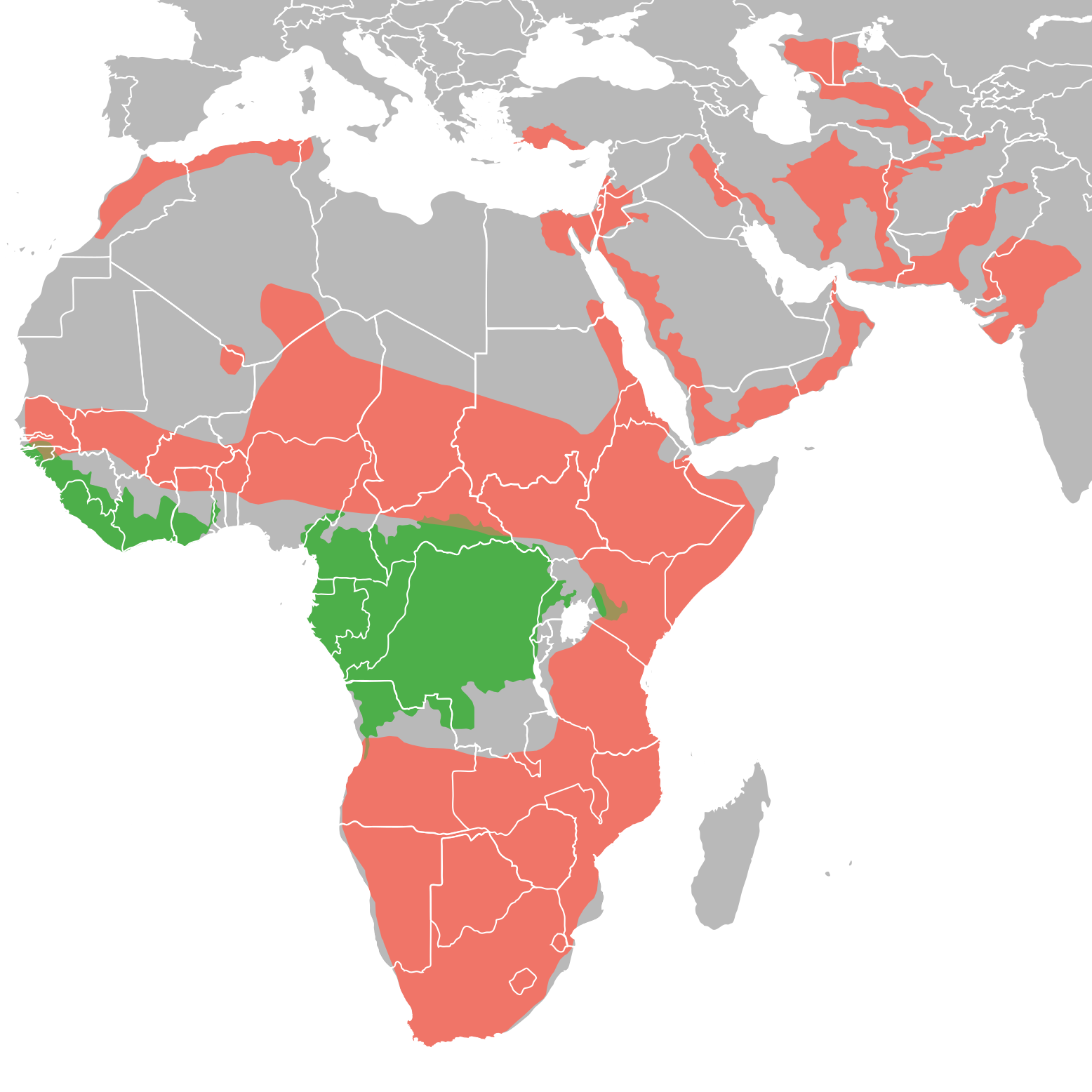
- Caracal distribution C. aurata in green, C. caracal in red

= Caracal (genus) =

Genus of carnivores

Caracal is a genus in the subfamily Felinae of the family Felidae. It was proposed by John Edward Gray in 1843 who described a skin from the Cape of Good Hope in the collection of the Natural History Museum, London. Historically, it was considered to be a monotypic genus, consisting of only the type species: the caracal C. caracal.

== Taxonomy ==
Phylogenetic analysis revealed that caracal, African golden cat (C. aurata) and serval (Leptailurus serval) are genetically closely related forming a genetic lineage that diverged from the common ancestor of the Felidae 7.91 to 4.14 million years ago. This taxonomic classification is used in the IUCN Red List for the African golden cat. It is used as a synonym for the serval.

Genus Caracal – Gray, 1843 – two species
Common name	Scientific name and subspecies	Range	Size and ecology	IUCN status and estimated population
African golden cat	C. aurata (Temminck, 1827) Two subspecies: C. a. aurata; C. a. celidogaster	Central and western Africa	Size: 65–90 cm (26–35 in) long, 28–35 cm (11–14 in) tail Habitat: Forest Diet: Rodents and squirrels, along with antelope and primates	VU Unknown
Caracal	C. caracal (Schreber, 1776) Three subspecies: C. c. caracals (Southern caracal); C. c. nubicus (Northern caracal); C. c. schmitzi (Asiatic caracal)	Most of non-Saharan Africa, Middle East, and southern Asia	Size: 80–100 cm (31–39 in) long, 20–34 cm (8–13 in) tail Habitat: Forest, desert, grassland, shrubland, and savanna Diet: Rodents, as well as antelope, birds, reptiles, and fish	LC Unknown
