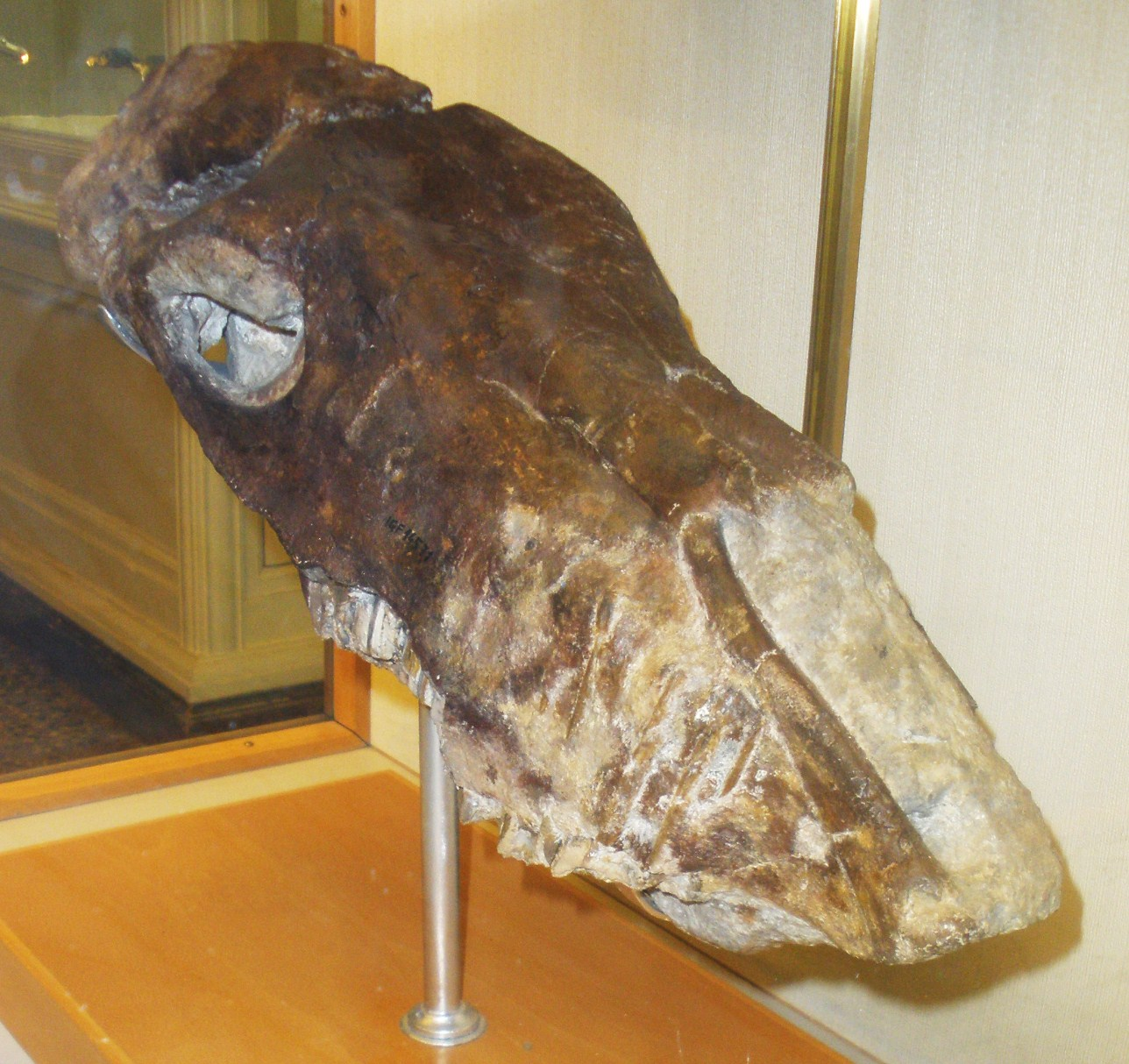
- Fossil

Scientific classification
- Kingdom: Animalia
- Phylum: Chordata
- Class: Mammalia
- Infraclass: Placentalia
- Order: Perissodactyla
- Family: Equidae
- Genus: Equus
- Species: †E. namadicus

Binomial name
- †Equus namadicus Falconer and Cautley, 1849

= Equus namadicus =

Equus namadicus Temporal range: Pleistocene

Extinct species of mammal

Equus namadicus is a prehistoric equid, known from remains dating to the Middle and Late Pleistocene from across the Indian subcontinent, with its last dated records being approximately 29–14,000 years ago. It is considered a "stenonine horse", related to species like the European Equus stenonis, meaning that it is probably more closely related to zebras and asses than true horses. It is relatively large in size. It is very similar to the earlier Equus sivalensis, also from the Indian subcontinent, from which it only differs in size and in subtle aspects of dental anatomy, and it has sometimes been suggested to be a synonym of it.
