= Lynx thomasi =

Lynx thomasi Temporal range: middle Pleistocene

Scientific classification
- Domain: Eukaryota
- Kingdom: Animalia
- Phylum: Chordata
- Class: Mammalia
- Order: Carnivora
- Suborder: Feliformia
- Family: Felidae
- Subfamily: Felinae
- Genus: Lynx
- Species: †L. thomasi

Binomial name
- †Lynx thomasi Geraads, 1980

Extinct fossil species of lynx

Lynx thomasi is an extinct fossil species of lynx. It was described in 1980 based on a lower jaw fossil found in Pleistocene-aged rock in Morocco.
