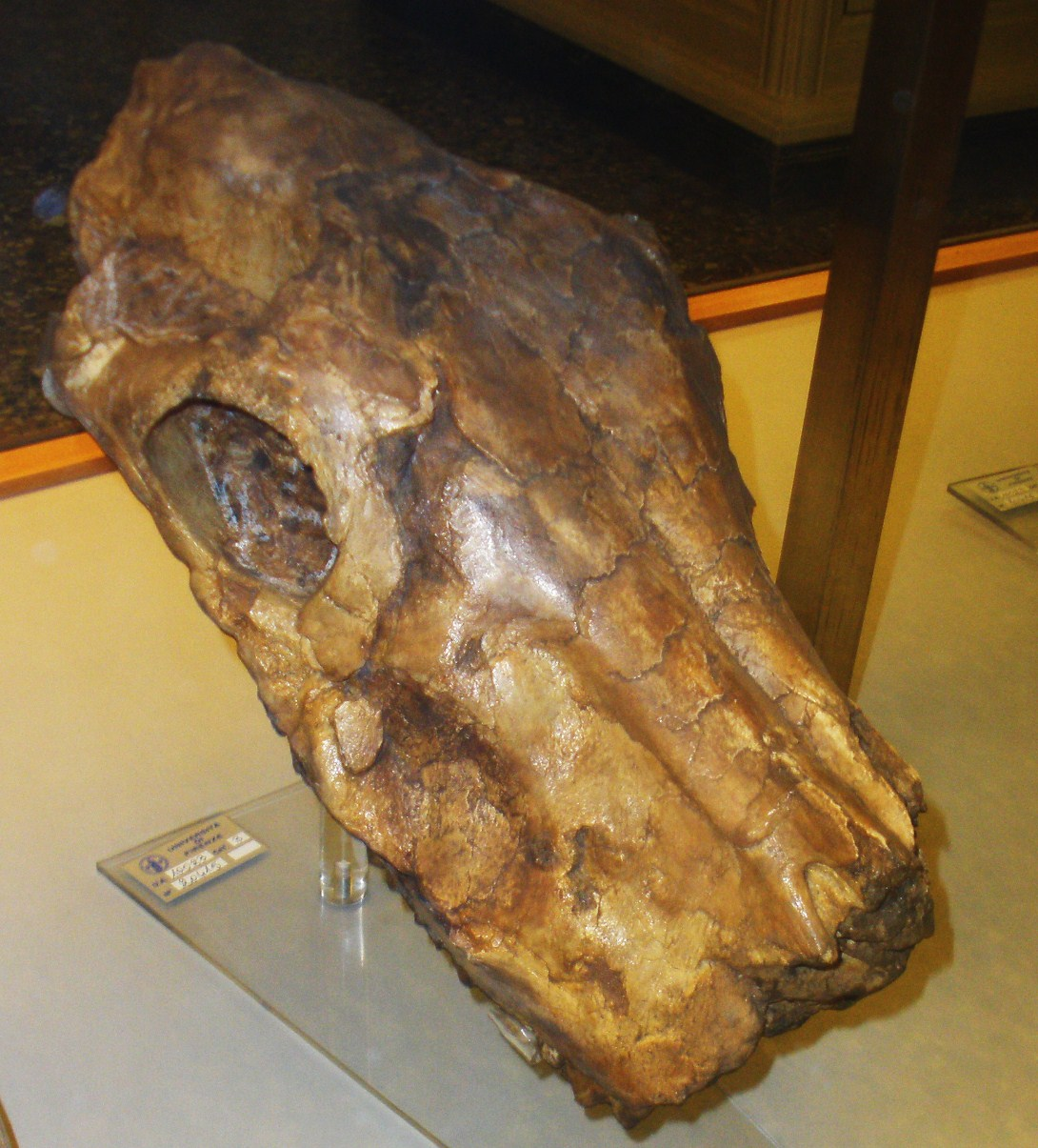

Scientific classification
- Kingdom: Animalia
- Phylum: Chordata
- Class: Mammalia
- Order: Perissodactyla
- Family: Equidae
- Genus: Equus
- Species: †E. sivalensis

Binomial name
- †Equus sivalensis Falconer & Cautley, 1849

= Equus sivalensis =

Equus sivalensis Temporal range: Early-Middle Pleistocene 2.58–0.6 Ma

Extinct species of mammal

Equus sivalensis or Sivalik Horse is an extinct species of large equid native to the northern Indian subcontinent. Remains date from the beginning of the Pleistocene, c. 2.58 million years ago until around 600,000 years ago, during the Middle Pleistocene. It is considered a "stenonine horse", meaning that it is more closely related to zebras and asses than true horses. Based on isotopes and teeth morphology, it is thought to have been a grazer. The later species Equus namadicus from the same region has sometimes been suggested to be a synonym due to their similar teeth morphology.
