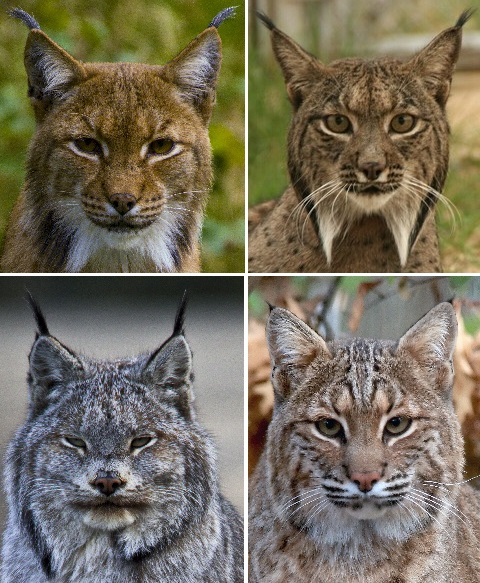
- The four species of lynx. From top-left, clockwise: Eurasian lynx (L. lynx), Iberian lynx (L. pardinus), bobcat (L. rufus), Canada lynx (L. canadensis)

Scientific classification
- Kingdom: Animalia
- Phylum: Chordata
- Class: Mammalia
- Order: Carnivora
- Family: Felidae
- Subfamily: Felinae
- Genus: Lynx; Kerr, 1792

Type species
- Felis lynx Linnaeus, 1758

Species
- Lynx lynx Linnaeus, 1758; Lynx canadensis Kerr, 1792; Lynx pardinus (Temminck, 1827); Lynx rufus (Schreber, 1777); †Lynx issiodorensis (Croizet & Jobert, 1828); †Lynx thomasi Geraads, 1980; †Lynx hei Jiangzuo et al., 2022
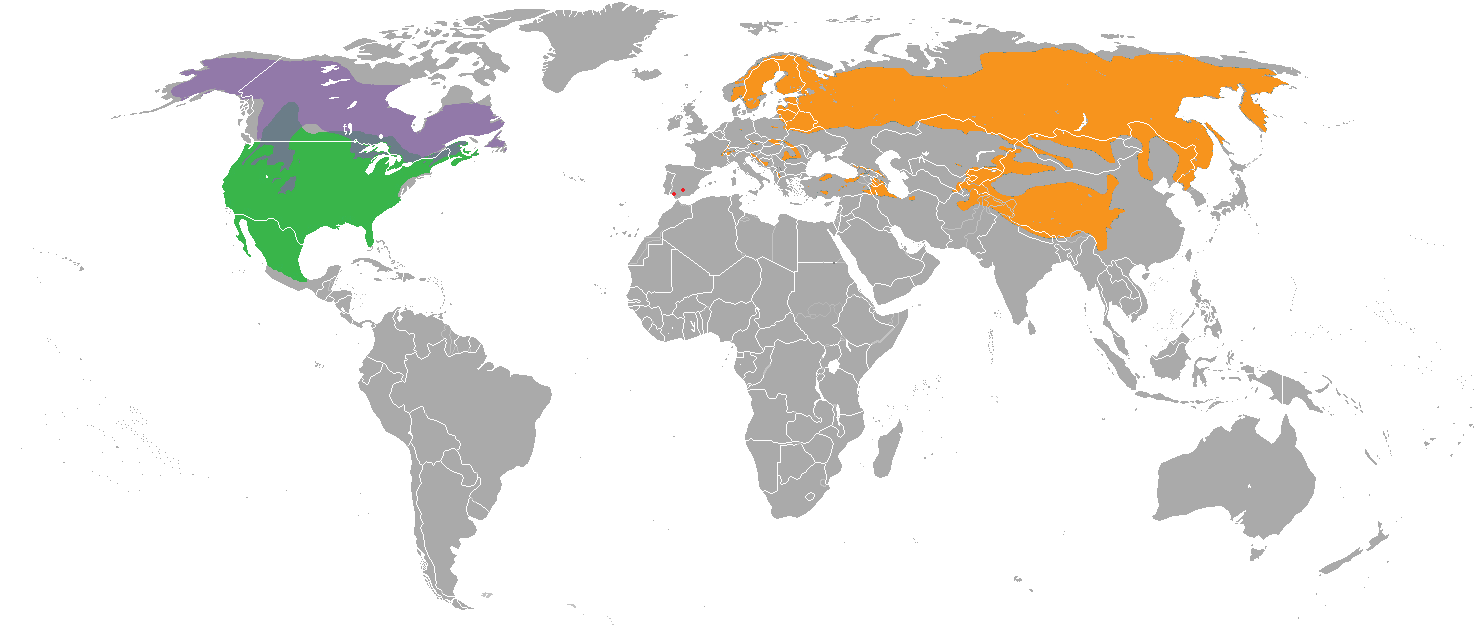
- Lynx ranges: Eurasian lynx (Lynx lynx) Canadian lynx (Lynx canadensis) Iberian lynx (Lynx pardinus) Bobcat (Lynx rufus)

= Lynx =

Lynx Temporal range: Pliocene–Recent

Genus of medium-sized wild cats

A lynx (/lɪŋks/ links; pl.: lynx or lynxes) is any of the four extant species (the Canada lynx, Iberian lynx, Eurasian lynx and the bobcat) within the medium-sized wild cat genus Lynx. The name originated in Middle English via Latin from the Greek word lynx (λύγξ),

== Appearance ==
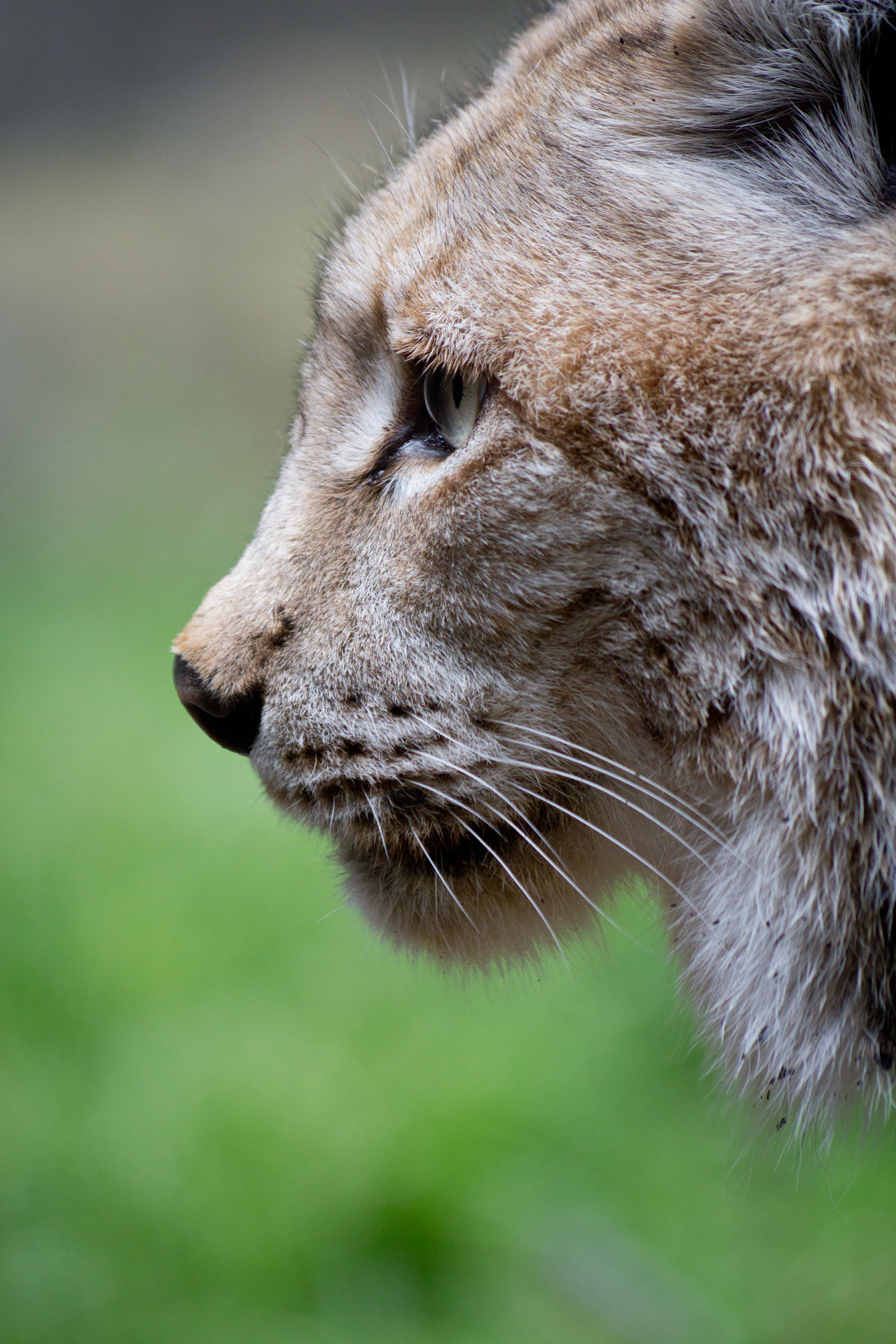
Profile view of a lynx

Lynx have a short tail, characteristic tufts of black hair on the tips of their ears, large, padded paws for walking on snow and long whiskers on the face. Under their neck, they have a ruff, which has black bars resembling a bow tie, although this is often not visible.

Body colour varies from medium brown to goldish to beige-white, and is occasionally marked with dark brown spots, especially on the limbs. All species of lynx have white fur on their chests, bellies and on the insides of their legs, fur which is an extension of the chest and belly fur. The lynx's colouring, fur length and paw size vary according to the climate in their range. In the Southwestern United States, they are short-haired, dark in colour, and their paws are smaller and less padded. In colder northern climates lynx have thicker and lighter fur as well as larger and more padded paws that are well-adapted to snow.

The smallest species are the bobcat and the Canada lynx, while the largest is the Eurasian lynx, with considerable variations within species.

== Species ==
All living Lynx species are thought to descend from Lynx issiodorensis, which first appeared during the early Pliocene in Africa, around 4 million years ago, shortly afterwards dispersing into Eurasia. The bobcat is thought to have arisen from a dispersal across the Bering Land Bridge during the Early Pleistocene, around 2.5 to 2.4 million years ago, with the Iberian lynx suggested to have speciated around 1 million years ago, at the end of the Early Pleistocene, the Eurasian lynx is thought to have evolved from Asian populations of Lynx issidorensis. The Canada lynx is thought to descend from a separate later migration of Eurasian lynx over the Bering Land Bridge around 200,000 years ago.

The Pliocene felid Felis rexroadensis from North America has been proposed as an even earlier ancestor; however, this was larger than any living species, and is not currently classified as a true lynx. Another extinct Lynx species, L. shansius, inhabited northern China during the Early Pleistocene, though this species is considered by some researchers to be a junior synonym of L. issiodorensis.

Genus Lynx – Linnaeus, 1758 – four species
| Common name | Scientific name and subspecies | Range | Size and ecology | IUCN status |
|---|---|---|---|---|
| Eurasian Lynx | Lynx lynx (Linnaeus, 1758) Six subspecies: L. l. lynx (Linnaeus, 1758); L. l. isabellinus Blyth, 1847; L. l. dinniki Satunin, 1915; L. l. wrangeli Ognew, 1928; L. l. carpathicus Kratochvil & Stollmann, 1963; L. l. balcanicus Bures, 1941 | European, Central Asian, and Siberian forests. | Size: Weight female:18 kg (40 lb) Length:81 to 129 cm (32 to 51 in) Height:70 cm (27 1/2 in) Habitat: rugged, forested country side Diet: A favorite prey for the lynx in its woodland habitat is roe deer. It will feed however on whatever animal appears easiest, as it is an opportunistic predator much like its cousins. | LC |
| Canada lynx | Lynx canadensis Kerr, 1792 Three subspecies: L. c. canadensis Kerr, 1792; L. c. subsolanus Bangs, 1897; L. c. mollipilosus Stone, 1900 | North American felid that ranges across Canada and into Alaska, as well as some parts of the northern United States. Historically, the Canadian lynx ranged from Alaska across Canada and into many of the northern U.S. states. By 2010, after an 11-year effort, it had been successfully reintroduced into Colorado, where it had become extirpated in the 1970s. In 2000, the U.S. Fish and Wildlife Service designated the Canada lynx a threatened species in the lower 48 states. | Size: Weight:8 to 14 kg (18 to 31 lb) Length: 90 cm (35 1/2 in) Height:48 to 56 cm (19 to 22 in) Habitat: forest and tundra regions In the eastern states, it resided in the transition zone in which boreal coniferous forests yielded to deciduous forests. Diet: The Canada lynx is a good climber and swimmer; it constructs rough shelters under fallen trees or rock ledges. It has a thick coat and broad paws, and is twice as effective as the bobcat at supporting its weight on the snow. The Canada lynx feeds almost exclusively on snowshoe hares; its population is highly dependent on the population of this prey animal. It also hunts medium-sized mammals and birds if hare numbers fall. | LC |
| Iberian lynx | Lynx pardinus (Temminck, 1827) | Iberian Peninsula | Size: Weight male: 12.9 kg (28 lb) female: 9.4 kg (20 3/4 lb) Length: 85 to 110 cm (33 1/2 to 43 1/2 in) Height: 60 to 70 cm (23 1/2 to 27 1/2 in) Habitat: coastal plains Diet: European rabbit (Oryctolagus cuniculus) for the bulk of its diet, supplemented by red-legged partridge (Alectoris rufa), rodents and, to a smaller degree, also on wild ungulates. | VU |
| Bobcat | Lynx rufus (Schreber, 1777) Two subspecies: L. r. rufus; L. r. fasciatus | Southern Canada, the continental United States, and northern Mexico. Like the Eurasian lynx, its conservation status is "least concern." | Size: Weight male:7.3 to 14 kg (16 to 30 3/4 lb) female: 9.1 kg (20 lb) Length:71 to 100 cm (28 to 39 1/2 in) Height:51 to 61 cm (20 to 24 in) Habitat: temperate deciduous, coniferous, or mixed woodlands, but unlike other Lynx, does not depend exclusively on the deep forest, and ranges from swamps and desert lands to mountainous and agricultural areas, its spotted coat serving as camouflage. Diet: | LC |

== Behavior and diet ==
The lynx is usually solitary, although a small group of lynx may travel and hunt together occasionally. Mating takes place in the late winter and once a year the female gives birth to between one and four kittens. The gestation time of the lynx is about 70 days. The young stay with the mother for one more winter, a total of around nine months, before moving out to live on their own as young adults. The lynx creates its den in crevices or under ledges. It feeds on a wide range of animals from white-tailed deer, reindeer, roe deer, small red deer, and chamois, to smaller, more usual prey: snowshoe hares, fish, foxes, sheep, squirrels, mice, turkeys and other birds, and goats. It also eats ptarmigans, voles, and grouse.

== Distribution and habitat ==
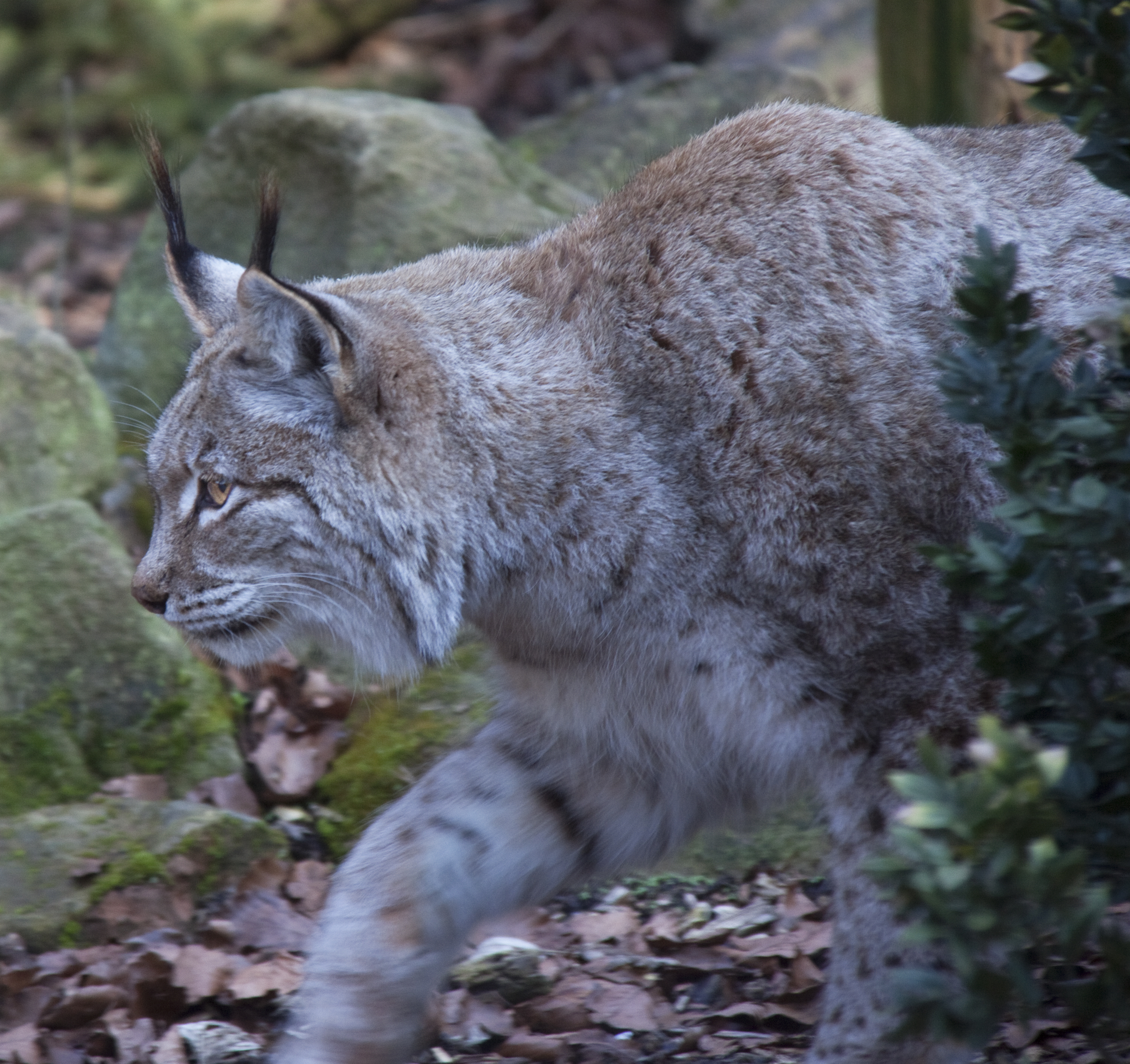
A lynx stalking prey

The lynx inhabits high elevation forests with dense cover of shrubs, reeds, and tall grass. Although this cat hunts on the ground, it can climb trees and can swim swiftly, catching fish.

=== Europe and Asia ===
The lynx was distributed throughout Japan during the Jōmon period; with no paleontological evidence thereafter suggesting extinction at that time.

The Eurasian lynx ranges from central and northern Europe across Asia up to northern Pakistan and India. In Iran, it lives in Mount Damavand area. Since the beginning of the 20th century, the Eurasian lynx was considered extinct in the wild in Slovenia and Croatia. A resettlement project, begun in 1973, has successfully reintroduced lynx to the Slovenian Alps and the Croatian regions of Gorski Kotar and Velebit, including Croatia's Plitvice Lakes National Park and Risnjak National Park. In both countries, the lynx is listed as an endangered species and protected by law. Several lynx resettlement projects begun in the 1970s have been successful in various regions of Switzerland. Since the 1990s, there have been numerous efforts to resettle the Eurasian lynx in Germany, and since 2000, a small population can now be found in the Harz mountains near Bad Lauterberg.

The Eurasian lynx occurs in the Białowieża Forest in northeastern Poland, and in the northern and western parts of China, particularly the Tibetan Plateau. In Romania, the numbers exceed 2,000, the largest population in Europe outside of Russia, although most experts consider the official population numbers to be overestimated. It is more common in northern Europe, especially in Norway, Sweden, Estonia, Finland, and the northern parts of Russia. The Swedish population is estimated to be 1200–1500 individuals, spread all over the country, but more common in middle Sweden and in the mountain range. The lynx population in Finland was 1900–2100 individuals in 2008, and the numbers have been increasing every year since 1992. The lynx population in Finland is estimated currently to be larger than ever before. Lynx in Britain were wiped out in the 17th century, but there have been calls to reintroduce them to curb the numbers of deer.

The Iberian lynx lives in southern Spain and formerly in eastern Portugal. There is an Iberian lynx reproduction center outside Silves in the Algarve in southern Portugal.

=== North America ===
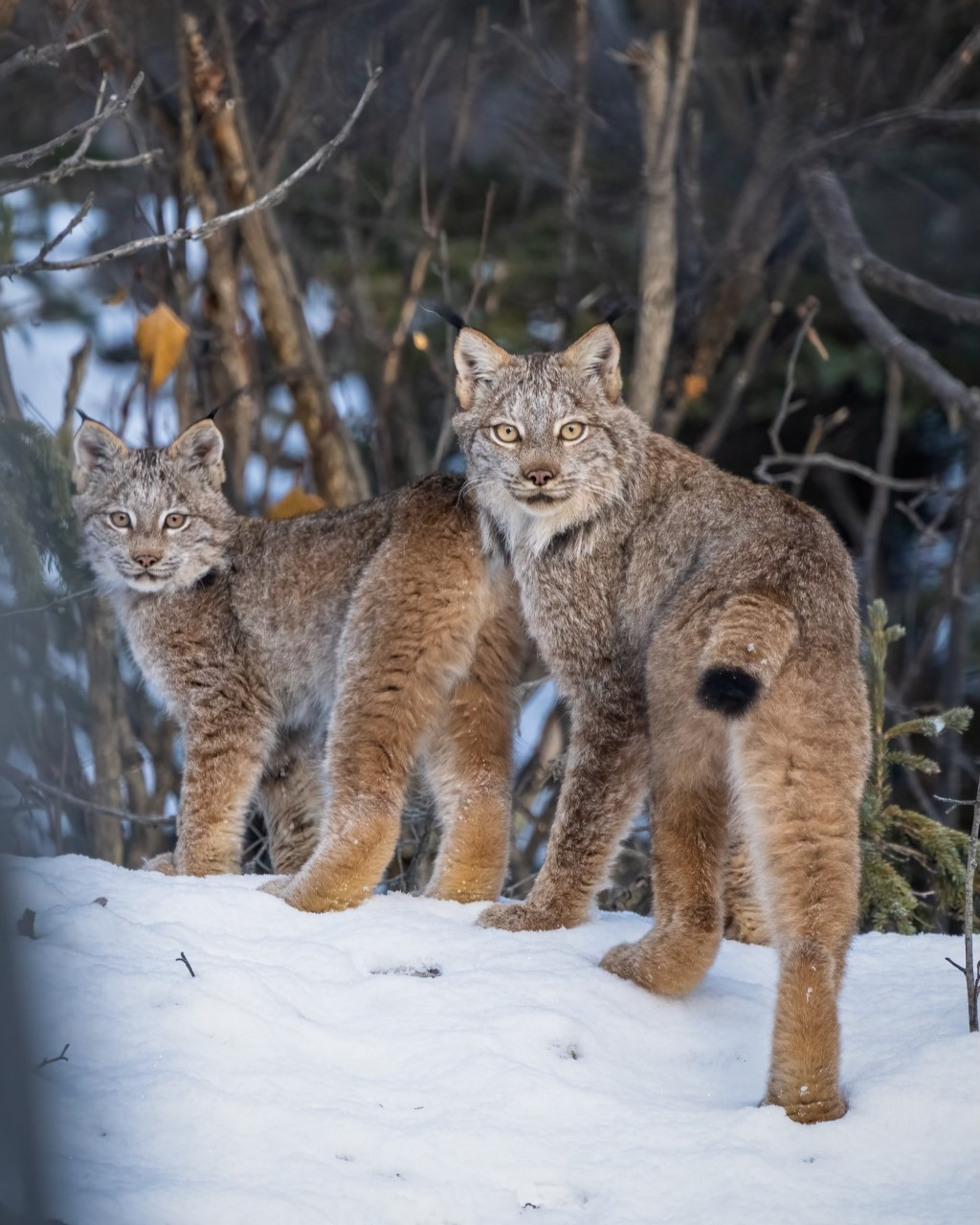
A mother and cub, Kenai National Wildlife Refuge, Alaska

The two Lynx species in North America, Canada lynx and bobcats, are both found in the temperate zone. While the bobcat is common throughout southern Canada, the continental United States and northern Mexico, the Canada lynx is present mainly in boreal forests of Canada and Alaska.

== See also ==
- Lynx (constellation)
- Lynx (mythology)
