= Claude W. Hibbard =

American paleontologist (1905–1973)

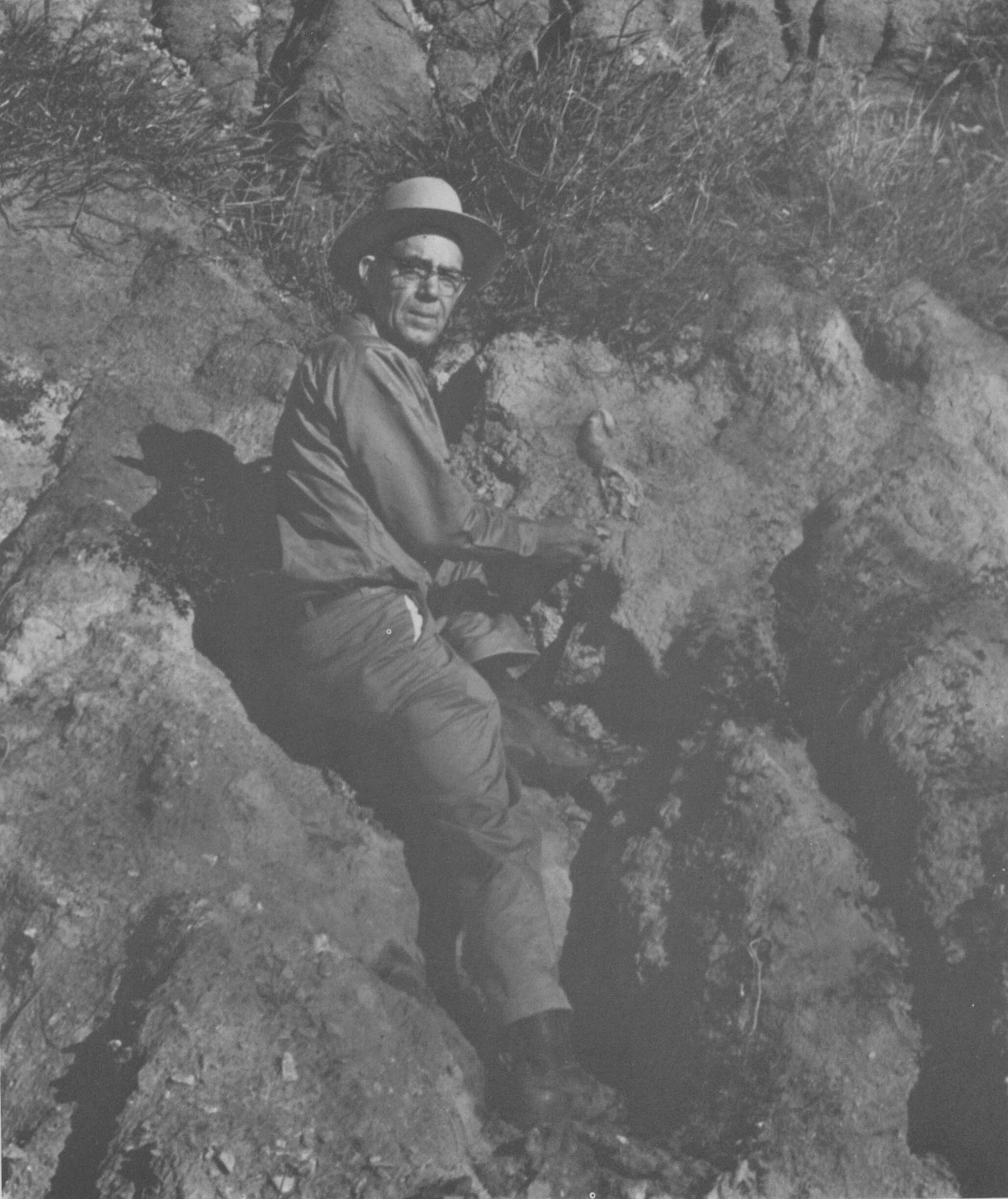
- Born: March 21, 1905; Toronto, Kansas, US
- Died: October 9, 1973 (aged 68); Ann Arbor, Michigan, US
- Education: Emporia State Teaching College; University of Kansas; University of Michigan
- Known for: wet-screening technique for recovering small fossils
- Scientific career
- Fields: zoology; paleontology
- Workplaces: University of Kansas

Claude William Hibbard, popularly known as Hibbie (March 21, 1905 in Toronto, Kansas – October 9, 1973 in Ann Arbor, Michigan), was an American paleontologist.

== Early life and education ==
Born on a farm in rural southeastern Kansas as the oldest of six children, Hibbard graduated from Fall River High School in 1923. He attended Emporia State Teaching College in Emporia, Kansas, during the summer and the following autumn became principal of a school in Thrall, Kansas.

In 1926, he enrolled in the University of Kansas at Lawrence as a pharmacy major. He frequently went on paleontological collecting trips. During one such excursion, he fashioned a primitive sieve to recover small vertebrate fossils. He received a Bachelor of Arts in 1933 and a Master of Arts in 1934, both in zoology.

== Career ==
After briefly moving to Kentucky to survey living mammals at what is now the Mammoth Cave National Park, he returned to Kansas, where he became Assistant Curator of Vertebrate Paleontology at the University of Kansas Museum of Natural History. In the summer of 1936, the University did not fund a paleontological collecting trip; accordingly, Hibbard was commissioned by the Museum of Zoology to survey living mammals in eastern Kansas, and found time to collect fossils between his trapping duties.

During his collecting trips in Kansas, which continued from 1936 in 39 mostly consecutive summers, Hibbard perfected the wet-screening technique for recovering small fossils, which caused a revolution in the knowledge of small mammal fossils. He went to the University of Michigan Museum of Zoology in 1936 to work on a dissertation, but returned to Lawrence, Kansas in 1938. Hibbard received his Ph.D. in Ann Arbor in 1941 and became Curator of Vertebrate Paleontology and Assistant Professor of Zoology in Kansas. He moved to Ann Arbor definitively in 1946 and became Professor of Geology in 1953, a position he held until his death in 1973.

== Works ==
More than 80 scientists attended a symposium in his honor on May 7–8, 1974. Hibbard wrote 158 scientific papers and was renowned for his discipline, dedication, and early rising. At least 18 species were named after him and he served as president of the Society of Vertebrate Paleontology, Kansas Academy of Science, Michigan Academy of Science, and Michigan Geological Society, and director of the American Society of Mammalogists, American Society of Ichthyologists and Herpetologists, and American Geological Institute.

== Personal life ==
Hibbard married Faye Ganfield in September 1935. They had a daughter, Katherine, and two grandchildren.
