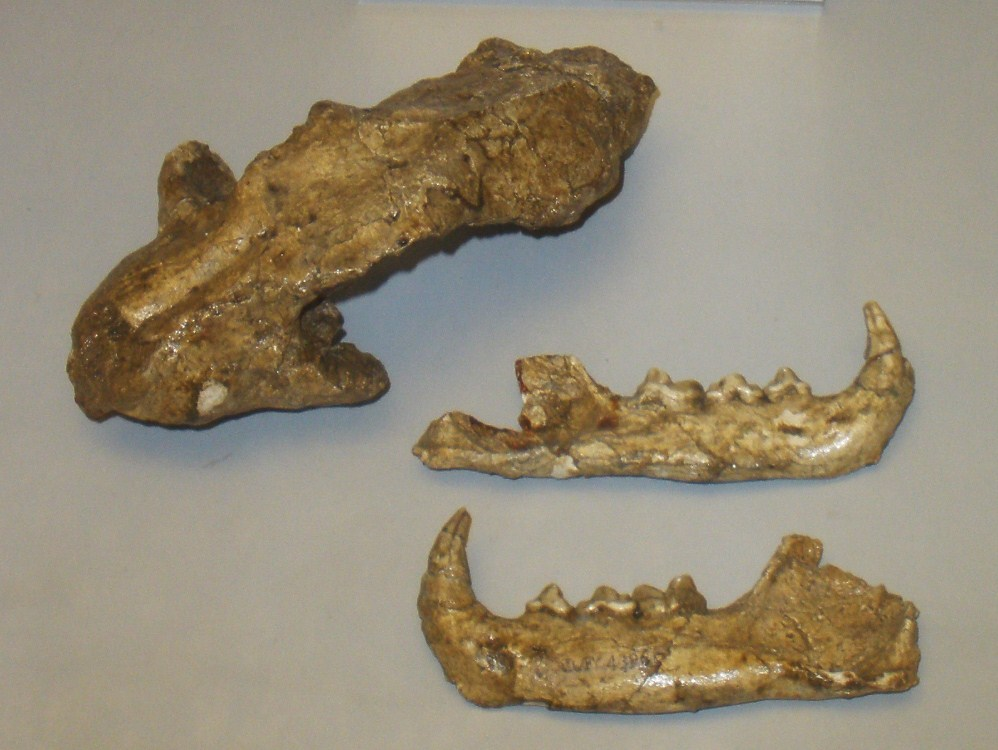
- Fossils

Scientific classification
- Kingdom: Animalia
- Phylum: Chordata
- Class: Mammalia
- Infraclass: Placentalia
- Order: Carnivora
- Family: Felidae
- Genus: Lynx
- Species: †L. issiodorensis

Binomial name
- †Lynx issiodorensis (Croizet & Jobert, 1828)

Synonyms
- Lynx shansius Tielhard, 1945

= Lynx issiodorensis =

Issoire lynx Temporal range: Villafranchian

Extinct species of felid

Lynx issiodorensis, sometimes called the Issoire lynx, is an extinct species of lynx that inhabited Europe during the Pliocene to Pleistocene epochs, and may have originated in Africa during the Late Pliocene. It is named after the town of Issoire where the first fossilised remains were found. It probably became extinct during the end of the last glacial period.

It is generally considered as the ancestor of all four species of lynx alive today. Its skeleton resembled that of living lynxes, but it had shorter and more robust limbs, with a larger head and longer neck. As a result, the Issoire lynx was closer in appearance to a typical member of the cat family than to its extant descendants.

== Taxonomy ==
In 1945, another lynx species, Lynx shansius, was described based on fossils from Asia. However, in 1984 a reexamination of the L. shansius material determined it to be synonymous with L. issiodorensis.

== Distribution ==
L. issiodorensis is known from France, Czechia, Romania, Italy, Bulgaria, Greece, Georgia, Russia, and China.

== Palaeobiology ==
=== Diet ===
The mandibular geometry of L. issiodorensis suggests that it was specialised to predate on medium-sized prey.
