= Guy Ellcock Pilgrim =

British scientist

(Henry) Guy Ellcock Pilgrim (Stepney, Barbados, 24 December 1875 – Upton, then in Berkshire, 15 September 1943) was a British geologist and palaeontologist. He was a Fellow of the Royal Society and Superintendent of the Geological Survey of India, and made significant contributions to Cenozoic continental stratigraphy and vertebrate palaeontology.

== Biography ==
Pilgrim was born the son of Henry Ellcock Pilgrim and Beatrice Lucy Wrenford. After studies at the local Harrison College, he attended University College London where he received his Bachelor of Science in 1901 and Doctor of Science in 1908. He was appointed to the Geological Survey of India in 1902 and promoted to superintendent in 1920, a post he held until his retirement in 1930. He spent much of his retirement at the Department of Geology at the British Museum.

Pilgrim explored the geology of Arabia and Persia. He was the first European to visit parts of Trucial Oman and the first geologist to explore Bahrain Island where his discoveries lead to the present oil exploitations there.

== Publications ==
| Title | Year |
|---|---|
| The geology of the Persian gulf and adjoining portions of Persia and Arabia by Pilgrim | 1908 |
| The fossil Giraffidae of India | 1911 |
| Fossil mammals, India and Burma | 1911 |
| The vertebrate fauna of the Gaj series in the Bugti Hills and the Punjab | 1912 |
| Collected papers | 1913 |
| New Siwalik primates and their bearing on the question of the evolution of man and the anthropoidea | 1915 |
| The geology of parts of the Persian provinces of Fars, Kirman, and Laristan | 1925 |
| The Perissodactyla of the Eocene of Burma | 1926 |
| The fossil Suidae of India | 1926 |
| The fossil Carnivora of India | 1927 |
| Geological map of the Simla Hills | 1927 |
| A Sivapithecus palate and other primate fossils from India | 1927 |
| Catalogue of the Pontian Bovidae of Europe in the Department of Geology | 1928 |
| The structure and correlation of the Simla rocks | 1928 |
| The Artiodactyla of the Eocene of Burma | 1928 |
| Catalogue of the Pontian Carnivora of Europe in the Department of Geology by British Museum (Natural History). Dept. of Geology | 1931 |
| A fossil skunk from Samos | 1933 |
| Two new species of sheep-like antelope from the Miocene of Mongolia | 1934 |
| Correlation of ossiferous sections in the Upper Cenozoic of India | 1934 |
| Siwalik antelopes and oxen in the American Museum of Natural History | 1937 |
| The fossil Bovidae of India | 1939 |
| The screw-horned antelope of the European Upper Pliocaens and its systematic position | 1939 |
| Middle Eocene Mammals from North-west India | 1940 |
