= Ringold Formation =

Sediment formation in Washington, United States

- Stratigraphic range: Late Miocene-Pliocene, 8.5–3 Ma
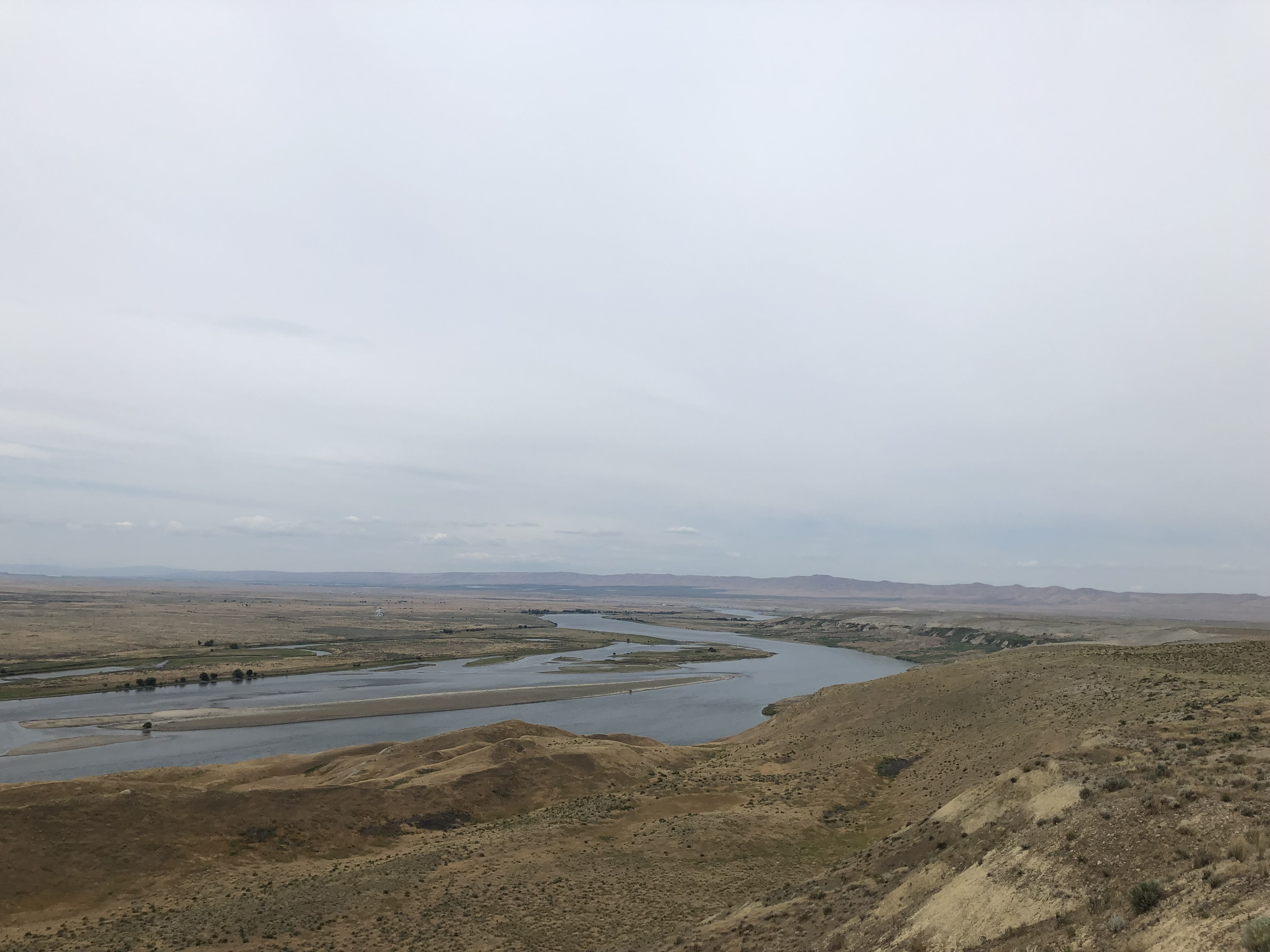
- The Columbia River flowing through the Ringold Formation.
- Type: Formation
- Underlies: Deposits from Missoula Floods
- Overlies: Columbia River Basalt Group
- Thickness: 1,000 feet (300 m)

Location
- Coordinates: 46.667°N 119.436°W
- Region: Washington (state)
- Country: United States

Type section
- Named for: Ringold Post Office
- Named by: John C. Merriam, John P. Buwalda

The Ringold Formation is a geological formation in Eastern Washington, United States. The formation consists of sediment laid down by the Columbia River following the flood basalt eruptions of the Columbia River Basalt Group, and reaches up to 1,000 feet (300 m) thick in places. It preserves fossils dating back to the late Miocene and Pliocene epochs of the Neogene period.

Exposures of the Ringold Formation can be found from Hanford Reach National Monument north to the Moses Lake area. Large portions of the formation are buried by other sediment deposits, extending as far as Wallula Gap southeast of Kennewick. In recent years, irrigation water entering the groundwater system has destabilized some Ringold Formation slopes and cliffs, causing landslides. The formation was named in 1917 for a school of the same name that existed at the time. Ringold School was located on the Franklin County side of the Columbia River to the south of Savage Island.

== Geology ==
During the flood basalt eruptions before the sediments were laid down, the Columbia River followed a different route than it does today, taking it near the present-day sites of Yakima and Goldendale. North-to-south compression of the Columbia Plateau caused anticline folds like Rattlesnake Mountain and the Horse Heaven Hills to rise.

These ridges provided geographic barriers, rerouting the river eastward toward the Tri-Cities with it eventually flowing through Wallula Gap. During part of this period, the Columbia River was completely dammed leading to the development of a large lake covering the Yakima Valley and southern Columbia Basin. The Ringold Formation is the sediment laid down during the period of the lake's existence and while the route of the river was changing.

Some of the sediments found as part of the formation may have been sourced from ancestral versions of other Pacific Northwest rivers like the Clearwater and Pend Oreille. Layers of volcanic ash can also be found, with thicknesses ranging from being barely noticeable to 4 feet (1.2 m) thick.

=== Stratigraphy ===
The Ringold Formation represents sand and gravel placed by the Columbia River between around 8.5 and 3 million years ago. These deposits overlay cooled lava erupted as part of the Columbia River Basalt Group, a type of volcanic eruption known as flood basalts erupting from fissures across eastern Washington and Oregon that were unrelated to the Cascade Range. It is covered in places by deposits from the Missoula Floods.

Regional uplift caused the Columbia to erode parts of the Ringold Formation. The White Bluffs on Hanford Reach National Monument are a significant example of this.

=== Recent landslides ===
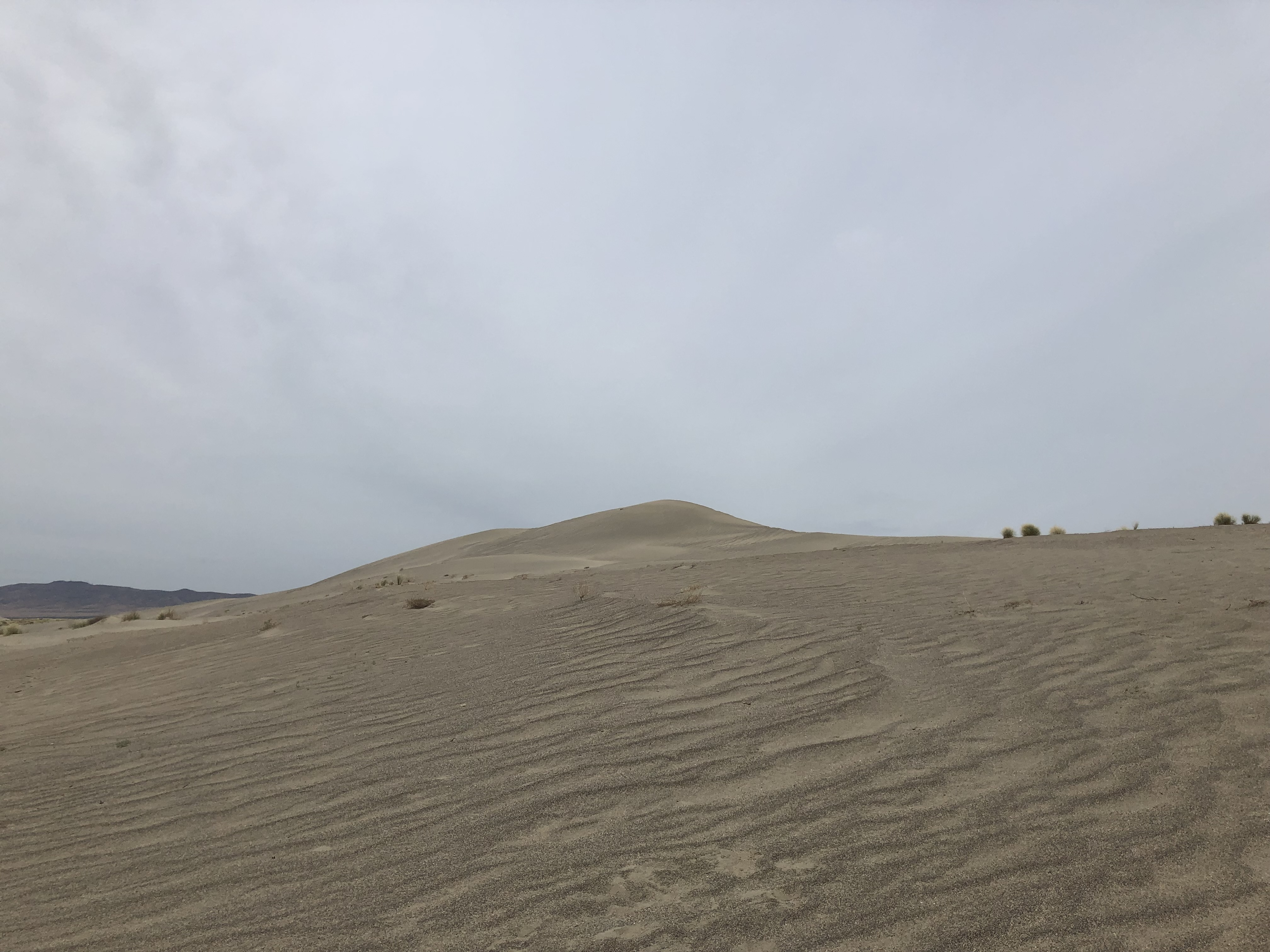
Sand dunes on top of White Bluffs. The material in this small dune field is from a nearby landslide.

Landslides along the Columbia River have increased in recent years due to irrigation around Basin City and Othello. Irrigation water enters and flows through the groundwater system toward the river easily through deposits left by the Missoula Floods. This destabilizes Ringold Formation features like the White Bluffs, causing the landslides. Landslides did not occur frequently before 1960. Rapid changes in river flow caused by the Priest Rapids Dam upstream may also contribute to slope destabilization.

The largest landslide in the White Bluffs portion of the formation is adjacent to Locke Island. This complex, initiated in the 1970s, has rerouted the Columbia River. As a result of the change, critical salmon spawning habitat has been destroyed. The landslide restricts the flow of the river on the east side of the river and as a result, large portions of Locke Island are being removed by the Columbia River. Movement of this landslide is ongoing, but the primary factor behind the continued movement is destabilization by the Columbia River eroding the fallen material. Blown sand from this landslide is the primary source material for sand dunes atop the bluffs near the island.

The Locke Island slide is the northernmost slide along the White Bluffs. There are at least five other major slides into the Columbia River, with the southernmost one being across the river from Pacific Northwest National Laboratory in north Richland, which occurred in 2008. At least one slide has occurred in nearby coulees.

== Paleobiota ==
Color key: Taxon / Reclassified taxon / Taxon falsely reported as present / Dubious taxon or junior synonym / Ichnotaxon / Ootaxon / Morphotaxon	Notes; Uncertain or tentative taxa are in small text; ~~crossed out~~ taxa are discredited.

=== Mammals ===
The mammal fossils of the Ringold Formation are divided into several local faunas, from youngest to oldest:

- Taunton local fauna (Blancan III NALMA, chron C2An.1r of the mid-Pliocene, ~3.05 million years old)
- Blufftop local fauna (Blancan II NALMA, mid-Pliocene, ~4.3 million years old)
- White Bluffs local fauna (Blancan I NALMA, chrons C3n.3r or C3n.2r of the early Pliocene, 4.98–4.62 million years old)
- River Road local fauna (late Hemphillian NALMA, latest Miocene or earliest Pliocene)

==== Artiodactyla ====
Artiodactyls of the Ringold Formation
Genus / Taxon	Species	Local fauna	Notes	Images
Antilocapridae		White Bluffs	Indeterminate pronghorns.	
† Bretzia	† B. pseudalces	White Bluffs	A very common capreoline deer with palmate antlers similar to moose. One of the earliest deer in North America.	
† Camelops	† C. sp.	Taunton	A large camel.	
† Capromeryx	† C. tauntonensis	Taunton	An antilocaprid (pronghorn). Later Capromeryx species were quite small, but this early species was only slightly smaller than living pronghorns.	
Cervidae		Blufftop, Taunton	Indeterminate deer. Some Taunton fossils are similar to Odocoileus (mule deer and kin) and Rangifer (reindeer).	
† Hemiauchenia	† H. blancoensis	White Bluffs, Taunton	A common lamine camelid (related to llamas, alpacas, and kin).	
† Megatylopus	† M. sp. aff. M. gigas	River Road, White Bluffs	A common large camel, either M. gigas or M. cochrani.	
† Platygonus	† P. pearcei	White Bluffs	A common flat-headed peccary.	
† Platygonus	† P. sp.	Taunton	A common flat-headed peccary.	

==== Carnivora ====
Carnivorans of the Ringold Formation
Genus / Taxon	Species	Local fauna	Notes	Images
Bassariscus	B. astutus	White Bluffs, Taunton	The living ringtail, a species of procyonid (raccoon-like mammals).	
† Borophagus	† B. diversidens	Taunton	A very large borophagine (bone-crushing dog).	
† Borophagus	† B. hilli	White Bluffs	A very large borophagine (bone-crushing dog).	
† Buisnictis	† B. cf. breviramus	Taunton	A skunk.	
Canis	† C. lepophagus	Taunton	A coyote-like canine.	
† Chasmaporthetes	† C. ossifragus	White Bluffs	A long-limbed hyena.	
† Dinofelis	cf. † D. paleoonca	Taunton	A possible machairodontine (saber-toothed cat).	
† Eucyon	† E. davisi	White Bluffs	A coyote-like canine, previously classified as a species of Canis.	
"Felis"	F. sp.	White Bluffs, Taunton	A cougar-sized cat, probably the same as Puma lacustris or "Lynx rexroadensis".	
cf. † Homotherium	cf. † H. sp.	White Bluffs	A relatively small machairodontine (saber-toothed cat).	
† Huracan	† H. cf. schneideri	White Bluffs	A large ailuropodine (panda-like) bear, previously considered a species of Agriotherium. One of the last surviving ailuropodine bears in North America.	
Lynx	L. cf. rufus	Taunton	A possible bobcat.	
Mustela	† M. cf. rexroadensis	Taunton	A weasel.	
† Parailurus	† P. sp.	Taunton	A large ailurid (red panda-like mammal).	
† Plionarctos	† P. harroldorum	White Bluffs	A tremarctine (short-faced bear) which was probably ancestral to later tremarctines. Fossils of this species were previously identified as Ursus abstrusus or Tremarctos floridanus.	
† Plionarctos	† P. cf. harroldorum	Taunton	A tremarctine (short-faced bear) which was probably ancestral to later tremarctines. Fossils of this species were previously identified as Ursus abstrusus or Tremarctos floridanus.	
† Pliotaxidea	† P. sp.	White Bluffs	An American badger-like mustelid.	
Procyon?	P.? sp.	Taunton	A possible raccoon.	
† Satherium	† S. piscinarium	Taunton	An otter.	
Spilogale	S. sp.	Taunton	A spotted skunk.	
Taxidea	T. sp.	Taunton	An American badger.	
† Trigonictis	† T. cookii	White Bluffs, Taunton	An ictonychine (grison-like mustelid). T. cookii may represent small individuals of T. macrodon.	

==== Lagomorpha ====
Lagomorphs of the Ringold Formation
Genus / Taxon	Species	Local fauna	Notes	Images
† Alilepus	† A. vagus	Taunton	A rabbit.	
† Hypolagus	† H. edensis	Taunton	A rabbit.	
† Hypolagus	† H. furlongi	Taunton	A rabbit.	
† Hypolagus	† H. gidleyi	Taunton	A rabbit.	
† Hypolagus	† H. ringoldensis	White Bluffs, Taunton	A rabbit.	
Leporidae		Blufftop	An indeterminate rabbit or hare.	
† Nekrolagus	† N. progressus	White Bluffs	A rabbit.	
† Nekrolagus	† N.? sp.	Taunton	A rabbit.	

==== Perissodactyla ====
Perissodactyls of the Ringold Formation
Genus / Taxon	Species	Local fauna	Notes	Images
† Aphelops	† A. cf. mutilus		An aceratheriine rhinoceros, the oldest mammal in the formation.	
Equus	† Equus francescana	White Bluffs	A zebra-like horse similar to the Hagerman horse. Sometimes classified as Dolichohippus or Plesippus.	
Equus	† Equus simplicidens	Taunton	A zebra-like Hagerman horse. Sometimes classified as Dolichohippus or Plesippus.	
Tapirus	T. sp.	White Bluffs	A tapir.	
† Teleoceras	† T. hicksi	River Road, White Bluffs	A teleoceratin aceratheriine rhinoceros.	

==== Pilosa ====
Pilosans of the Ringold Formation
Genus / Taxon	Species	Local fauna	Notes	Images
† Megalonyx	† M. leptostomus	Taunton	A megalonychid ground sloth.	
† Megalonyx	† M. rohrmanni	White Bluffs	A fairly common megalonychid ground sloth.	

==== Proboscidea ====
Proboscideans of the Ringold Formation
Genus / Taxon	Species	Local fauna	Notes	Images
† Mammut	† M. americanum	White Bluffs	The oldest known fossils of the American mastodon.	

==== Rodentia ====
Rodents of the Ringold Formation
Genus / Taxon	Species	Local fauna	Notes	Images
Ammospermophilus	† A. hanfordi	White Bluffs	An antelope squirrel.	
Castor	† C. californicus	White Bluffs, Taunton	A beaver.	
† Dipoides	† D. rexroadensis	White Bluffs	A very large beaver.	
† Mimomys	† M. meadensis	Taunton	A microtine vole. Some fossils of this species were previously known as Ophiomys taylori.	
† Mimomys	† M. sawrockensis	White Bluffs	A microtine vole. Some fossils of this species were previously known as Ophiomys mcknighti.	
† Mimomys	† M. sawrockensis-taylori	White Bluffs, Blufftop	A microtine vole, intermediate between M. sawrockensis and M. taylori. Some fossils of this population were previously known as Ophiomys mcknighti.	
Neotoma (Paraneotoma)	† N. (P.) cf. fossilis	Taunton	A woodrat.	
Neotoma (Paraneotoma)	† N. (P.) cf. quadriplicatus	White Bluffs	A woodrat.	
† Paenemarmota	† P. sp.	White Bluffs	A very large marmot.	
Perognathus	P. sp.	Taunton	A pocket mouse.	
Peromyscus	† P. nosher	White Bluffs	A deer mouse.	
Ondatra (Pliopotamys)	† O. (P.) minor	Taunton	A muskrat.	
† Procastoroides	† P. cf. idahoensis	Taunton	A beaver.	
† Prodipodomys	† P. sp.	Taunton	A heteromyid with similarities to Dipodomys (kangaroo rats).	
Spermophilus	† S. cf. howelli	Taunton	A ground squirrel.	
Spermophilus	† S.? russelli	White Bluffs	A ground squirrel.	
Spermophilus	† S.? cf. russelli	Taunton	A ground squirrel.	
Thomomys	† T. cf. gidleyi	White Bluffs, Taunton	A smooth-toothed pocket gopher.	

==== Soricomorpha ====
Soricomorphs of the Ringold Formation
Genus / Taxon	Species	Local fauna	Notes	Images
† Paracryptotis	† P. rex	Blufftop	A shrew.	
Scapanus	S. sp.	White Bluffs	A broad-footed mole.	
Sorex	† S. cf. meltoni	Taunton	A long-tailed shrew.	
Sorex	† S. powersi	Blufftop	A long-tailed shrew.	
Sorex	S. sp.	Taunton	A long-tailed shrew.	

=== Birds ===
Birds of the Ringold Formation
Genus / Taxon	Species	Local fauna	Notes	Images
Aechmophorus	A. sp.	Taunton	A grebe.	
Anas	A. sp.	Taunton	A teal-like duck.	
Aythya	A. sp.	Taunton	A scaup-like duck.	
Branta	B. sp.	Taunton	A black goose.	
Dendragapus	D. sp.	Taunton	A grouse.	
Fulica	F. sp.	Taunton	A coot.	
Podiceps	P. sp.	Taunton	A grebe.	

=== Reptiles ===
Reptiles of the Ringold Formation
Genus / Taxon	Species	Local fauna	Notes	Images
Charina	C. bottae	Taunton	The living rubber boa.	
Chelonia		White Bluffs, Taunton	Indeterminate turtles and tortoises.	
Chrysemys?	C.? sp.	White Bluffs	A painted turtle.	
Clemmys	C. marmorata	White Bluffs	The living Western pond turtle.	
Coluber / Masticophis	C. sp. / M. sp.	Taunton	A racer or whip snake.	
Crotalus	C. sp.	Taunton	A rattlesnake.	
Elaphe	† E. pliocenica	Taunton	A rat snake.	
Elaphe	E. vulpina	Taunton	The living Eastern foxsnake.	
Lampropeltis	L. getula	Taunton	The living common kingsnake.	
Pituophis	P. catenifer	Taunton	The living Western gopher snake.	
Squamata		White Bluffs, Taunton	Indeterminate snakes and lizards.	
† Tauntonophis	† T. morganorum	Taunton	A colubrine colubrid snake.	
Testudo / Geochelone	T. sp. / G. sp.	White Bluffs	A tortoise.	
Thamnophis	T. sp.	Taunton	A garter snake.	

=== Amphibians ===
Indeterminate frog or toad bones are known from the White Bluffs local fauna.

=== Fish ===
Fish of the Ringold Formation
Genus / Taxon	Species	Local fauna	Notes	Images
Acipenser	A. transmontanus	White Bluffs, Blufftop, Taunton	The living white sturgeon.	
Acrocheilus	† A. latus	Taunton	A chiselmouth.	
Ameiurus	† A. reticulatus	White Bluffs, Blufftop, Taunton	A bullhead catfish.	
Archoplites	† A. molarus	White Bluffs, Blufftop, Taunton	A freshwater sunfish.	
Catostomus	C. macrocheilus	Blufftop, Taunton	The living largescale sucker.	
Chasmistes	† C. sp. cf. batrachops	White Bluffs, Blufftop, Taunton	A sucker.	
Esox	† E. columbianus	White Bluffs, Blufftop, Taunton	A large pike.	
† Klamathella	† K. milleri	Taunton	A chub.	
Lavinia	† L. hibbardi	Taunton	A hitch.	
Mylocheilus	† M. heterodon	White Bluffs, Blufftop, Taunton	A peamouth chub.	
Oncorhynchus	† O. rastrosus	River Road	A giant tusked salmon.	
Ptychocheilus	† P. arciferus	Blufftop, Taunton	A pikeminnow.	

=== Invertebrates ===
Several species of freshwater snails are known from the White Bluffs local fauna.

=== Plants and climate ===
Pollen has been sampled from the lower Ringold Formation (8.5–5.5 Ma, late Miocene) near Hanford, as well as the upper Ringold Formation (4.5–2.8 Ma) at White Bluffs. The lower Ringold flora is similar to moist eastern ecosystems such as the Mississippi lowland forests, where cypress and broadleaf hardwoods coexist in close proximity. Pollen from White Bluffs corresponds to semi-arid grassland plants such as grasses (Poaceae), saltbush-type plants (Amaranthaceae), and sunflower-type plants (Asteraceae), alongside rare pine pollen.

Warm-water fish and tortoises suggest that the fossil-rich Pliocene portion of the formation probably had hot summers (>27 °C (81 °F)) and mild winters. In warmer parts of the Pliocene, winters may have been entirely frost-free. Pike and sturgeon may indicate the presence of deep, persistent streams (rainfall >80 cm/year (31 in/year)). Other studies estimate a yearly rainfall not exceeding 40 cm/year (16 in/year), still much greater than the modern Columbia Plateau. Riverside floodplain environments were far more common than today, supporting a greater diversity of mammals and wetland inhabitants.

== See also ==
- Hanford Reach
- Lake Idaho
- List of fossiliferous stratigraphic units in Washington (state)
- Paleontology in Washington (state)
