= El Cajon Mountain =

Mountain in California, United States

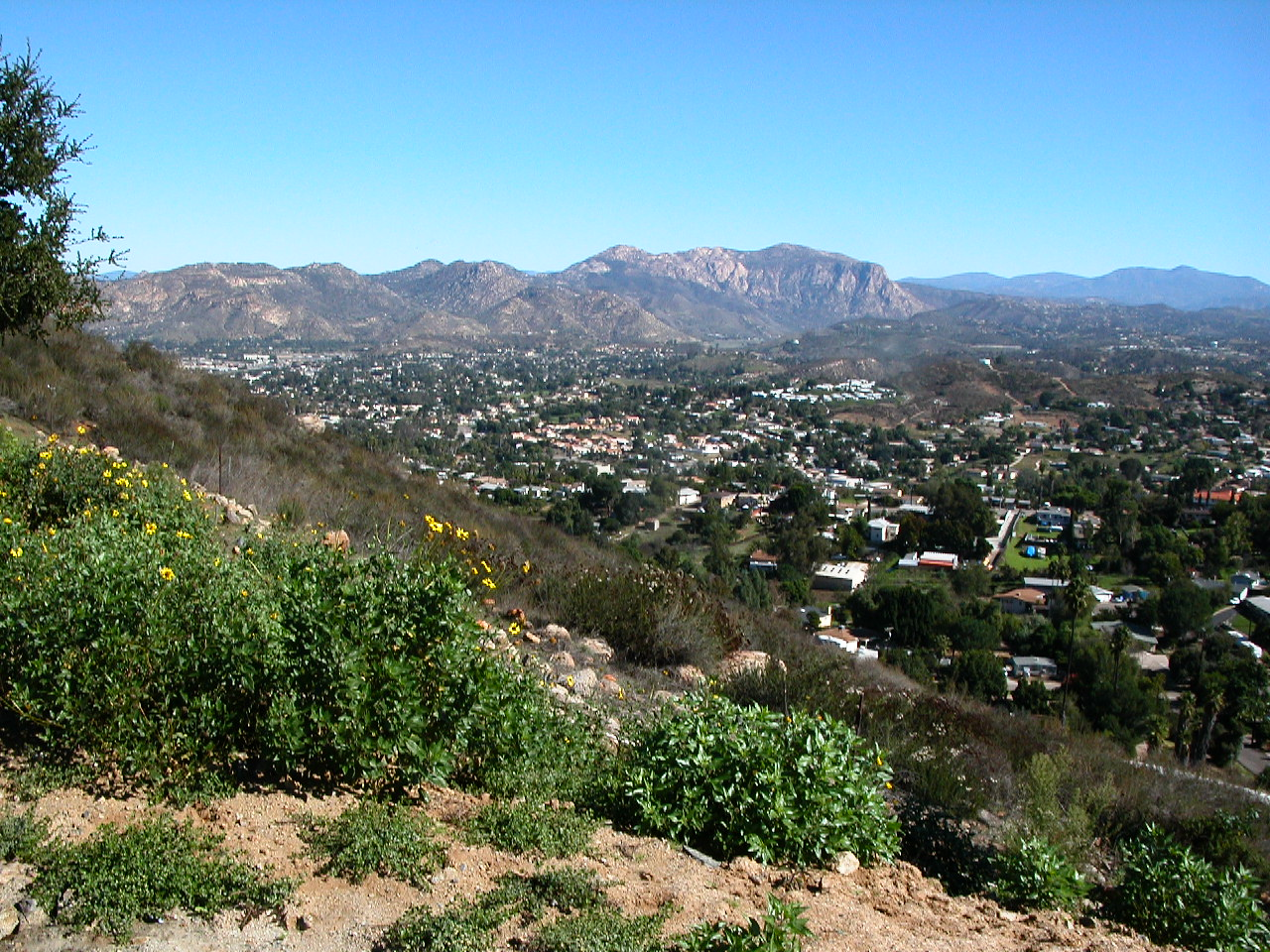
- View of El Cajon Mountain looking east from Sky Ranch development in Santee

Highest point
- Elevation: 3,677 ft (1,121 m)
- Prominence: 1,955 ft (596 m)
- Listing: San Diego peaks list
- Coordinates: 32°54′53″N 116°49′12″W

Geography
- Location within California
- Location: San Diego County, California
- Topo map: El Cajon Mountain

Climbing
- Easiest route: Hike class 1

El Cajon Mountain, commonly known as El Capitan or El Cap, is a mountain in the Cuyamaca Mountains, and prominent natural landmark in the East County of San Diego.

== Geography ==
The summit of El Cajon Mountain is at 3,677 feet (1,121 m). The mountain is almost completely surrounded by private property and an Indian reservation, but the mountain itself is mostly within the Cleveland National Forest or the County of San Diego's El Capitan County Preserve. The El Capitan County Preserve consists of 2,619 acres of open space with 11 miles of trail, and also includes three unused mine shafts.

About 385 acres of the mountain is an open space preserve, the El Capitan Mountain Preserve, owned by the San Diego River Park Foundation. The El Capitan Mountain Preserve was originally acquired by San Diego Gas and Electric in 2013 as mitigation for one of its projects, with the land purchased to protect the sensitive plant species Ceanothus cyaneus, the Lakeside ceanothus.

A weather station provided and maintained by a partnership between the San Diego River Park Foundation and the San Diego Hang Gliding and Paragliding Association (SDHGPA) was installed on the mountain in 2019.

=== Biogeography ===
El Cajon Mountain is covered in chaparral, coastal sage scrub, and woodland vegetation across its boulder-strewn landscapes, with riparian areas lined by oaks in its canyons. It is home to hundreds of species of plants, including a number of disjunct species. Many animal species occur here as well. The mountain is also subject to wildfires, and the plants present on the mountain are adapted to fire, with some species requiring it for germination. The mountain burned in 2003 during the Cedar Fire and parts of it in June of 2025 during the Monte Fire.

==== Plants ====
El Cajon Mountain is home to a number of rare, endemic, and relict plant species. Brodiaea orcuttii, Orcutt's brodiaea, and Ceanothus cyaneus, the Lakeside ceanothus, which are rare and endemic species restricted to the vicinity of San Diego County, are both found on the mountain. Two shrubs, Vaccinium ovatum, the evergreen huckleberry, and Rhododendron occidentale, the western azalea, also make unusual appearances here.

Vaccinium ovatum is usually associated with more wet habitats from the Pacific coast of North America from southern British Columbia in Canada to Santa Barbara County in California, but is also found in several disjunct populations in San Diego County, and the population on El Cajon Mountain is the southernmost locality for the species. The Rhododendron occidentale plants found on El Cajon Mountain are also the southernmost population of that species, which are usually found in more montane and moist habitats rather than the chaparral associated with El Cajon Mountain.

Other disjunct species found on the mountain include Quercus chrysolepis, the canyon live oak, also found typically in more montane and high-elevation habitats, and Hypericium anagalloides, a species of St. John's Wort.

==== Animals ====
Sensitive animal species found on the mountain include mountain lions, golden eagles, southern mule deer, and Blainville's horned lizard.

== Recreation ==
There are two main routes to climb El Cajon Mountain, the main class 1 trail hike from Lakeside, California, and several class 3 climbs up the south face, which is now private property and closed to public access. This closure was more to do with resident golden eagles utilizing the climbing face as a nesting area. The main trail hike is considered one of the hardest hikes in San Diego County because of its steep climbs and rolling terrain.

=== Deaths on the mountain ===
Thomas Castiglia (January 2019) 55 yo hiker: A resident of Scripps Ranch and an experienced hiker. He became separated from his group after experiencing shortness of breath. After a massive search, his body was discovered at the base of a sheer cliff.

Nathaniel Takatsuno (December 2022): A 22-year-old climber died after falling 200 feet while free soloing (climbing without protective gear) on "The Wedge" at El Cajon Mountain. He was attempting to climb the 5.9 pitch route known as "Leonids"

Johnathan L. Gorbea (March 2026): A 40-year-old Navy veteran and San Diego resident died after going missing on a hike on Saturday, March 21, 2026. His body was found by search and rescue crews on Sunday evening near a trail in the El Capitan County Preserve. Later post incident hikes showed that Johnathan had taken an unmarked spur trail, possibility in an attempt to seek shade. He was found roughly a quarter mile down the spur trail in an area with between 40-50% steepness grades. While he was found deceased without an obvious signs of major trauma, responders did note that he had scrapes, cuts and bruises; all of which indicate that he may have lost consciousness and fell prior to his eventual death.

== Gallery ==
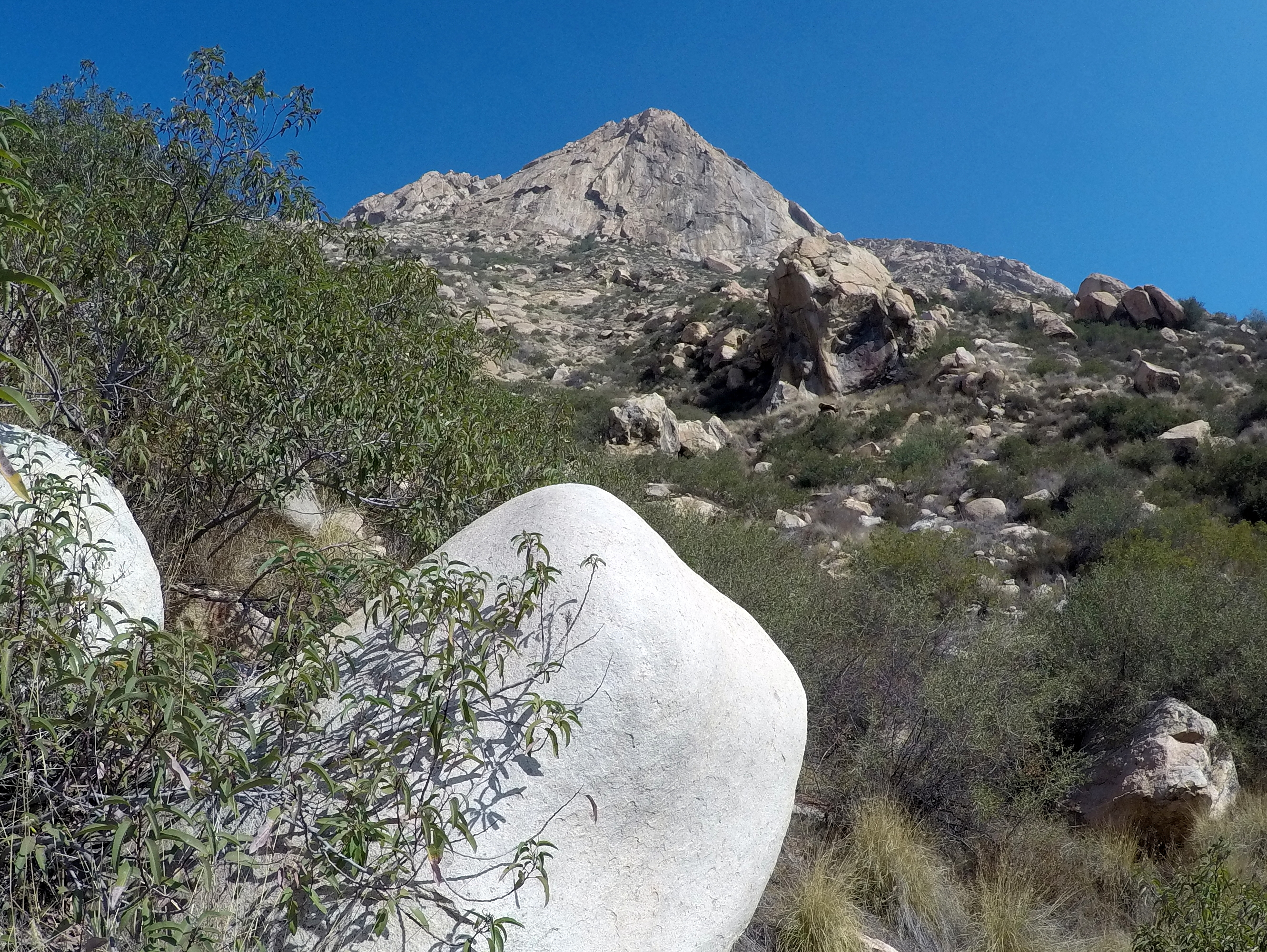
El Cajon Mountain Wall

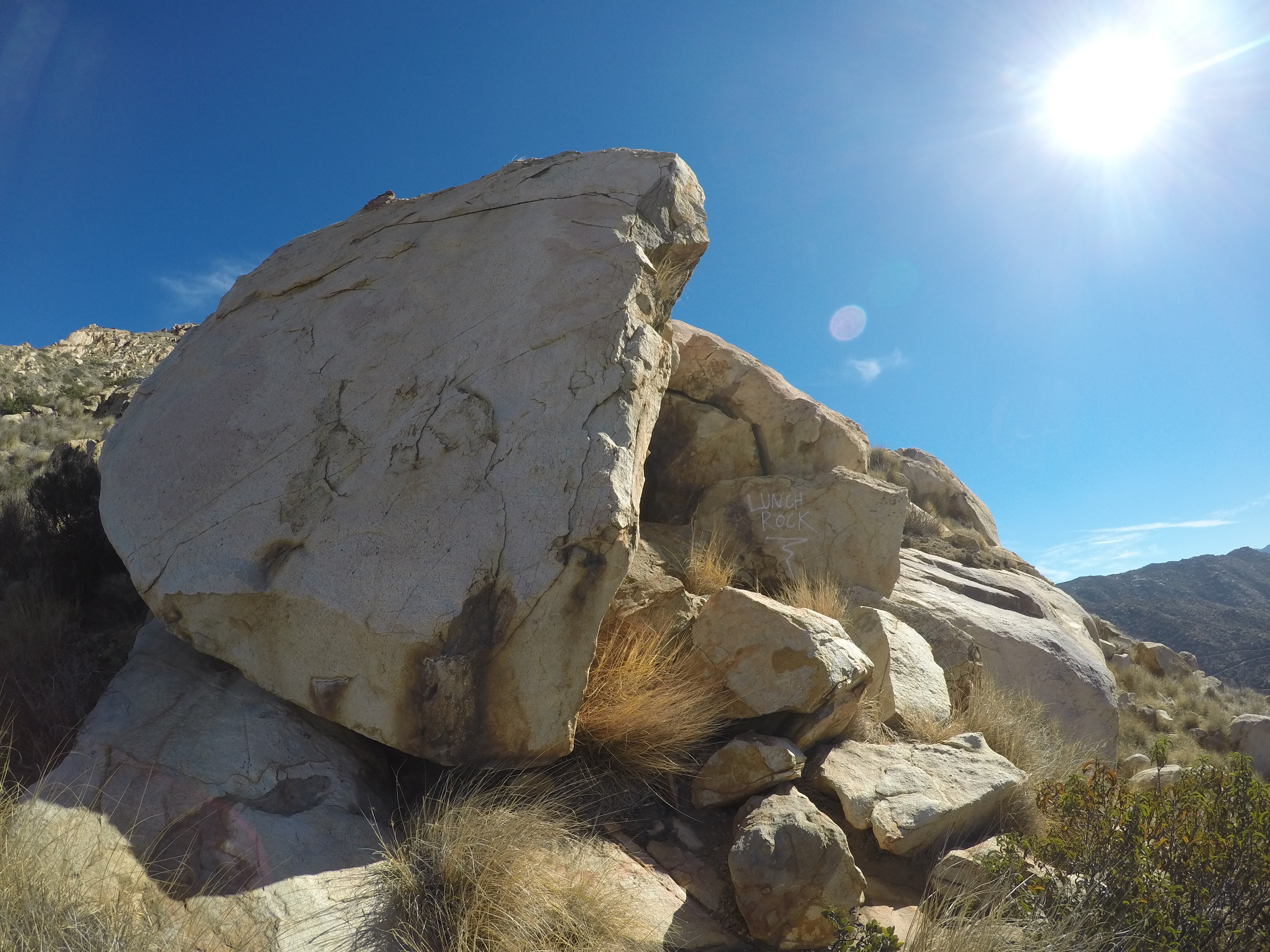
Lunch Rock on the middle of the south arete

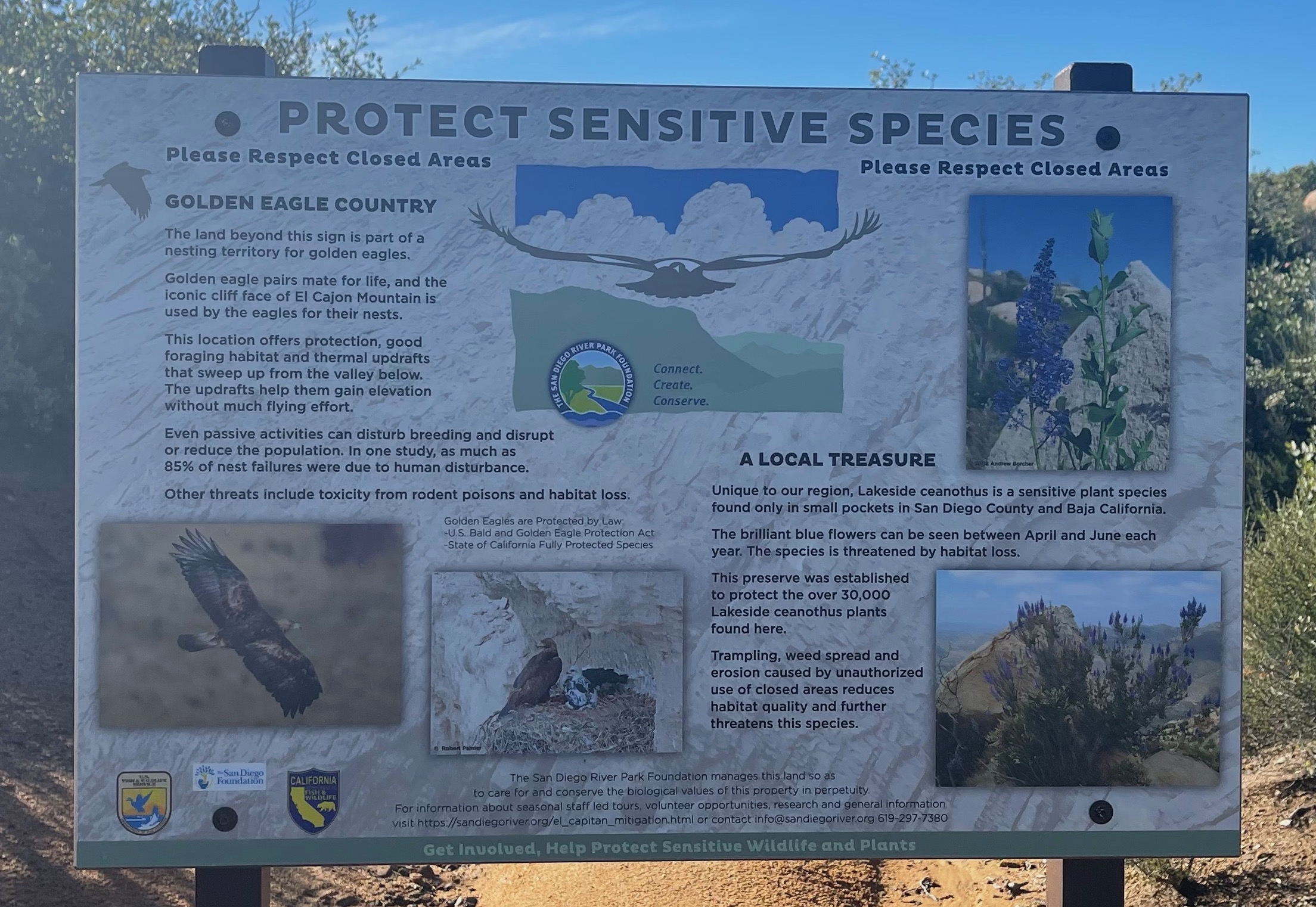
Sign at beginning of the class 3 trail

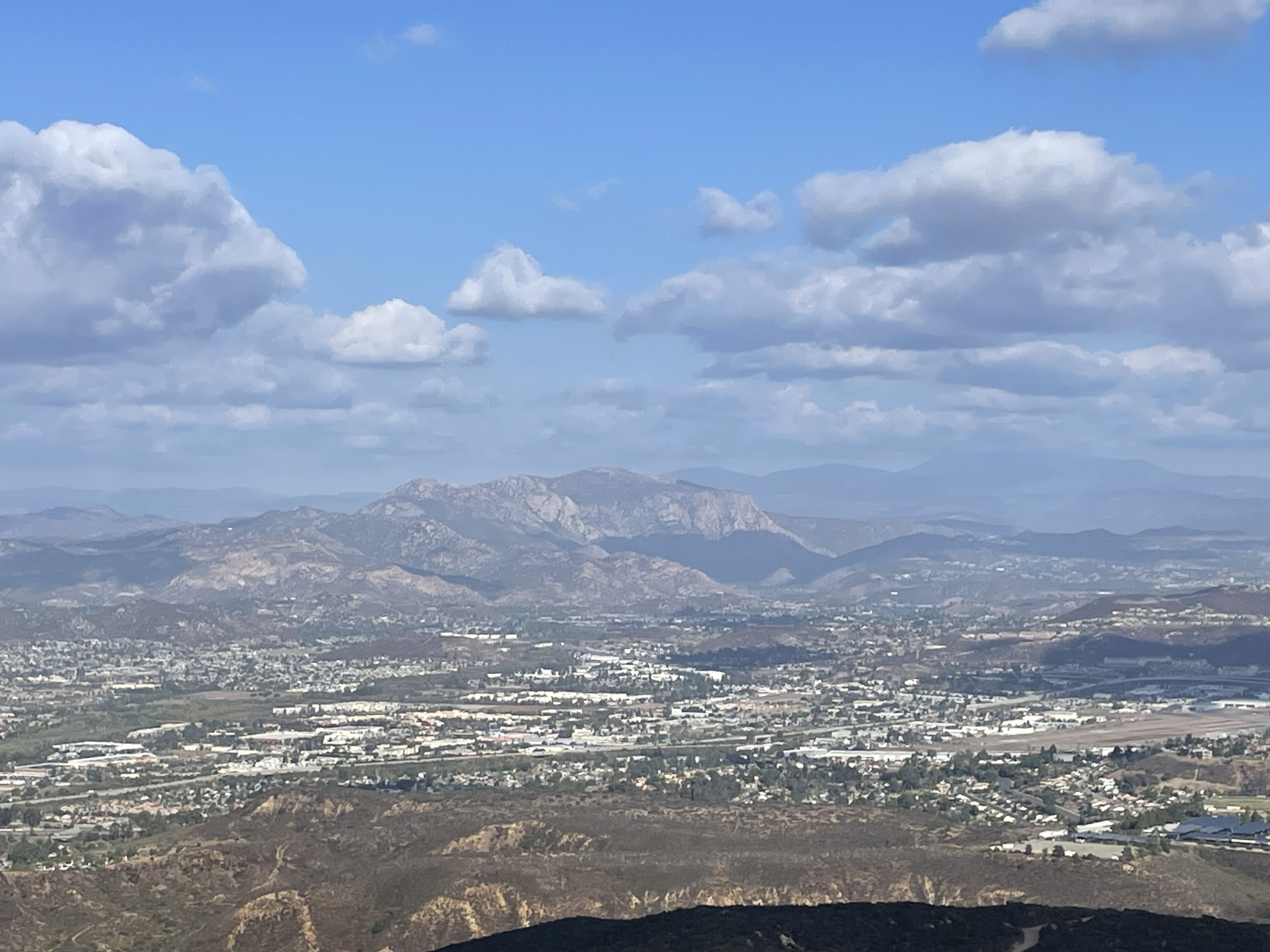
View of El Cajon Mountain from nearby Cowles Mountain.

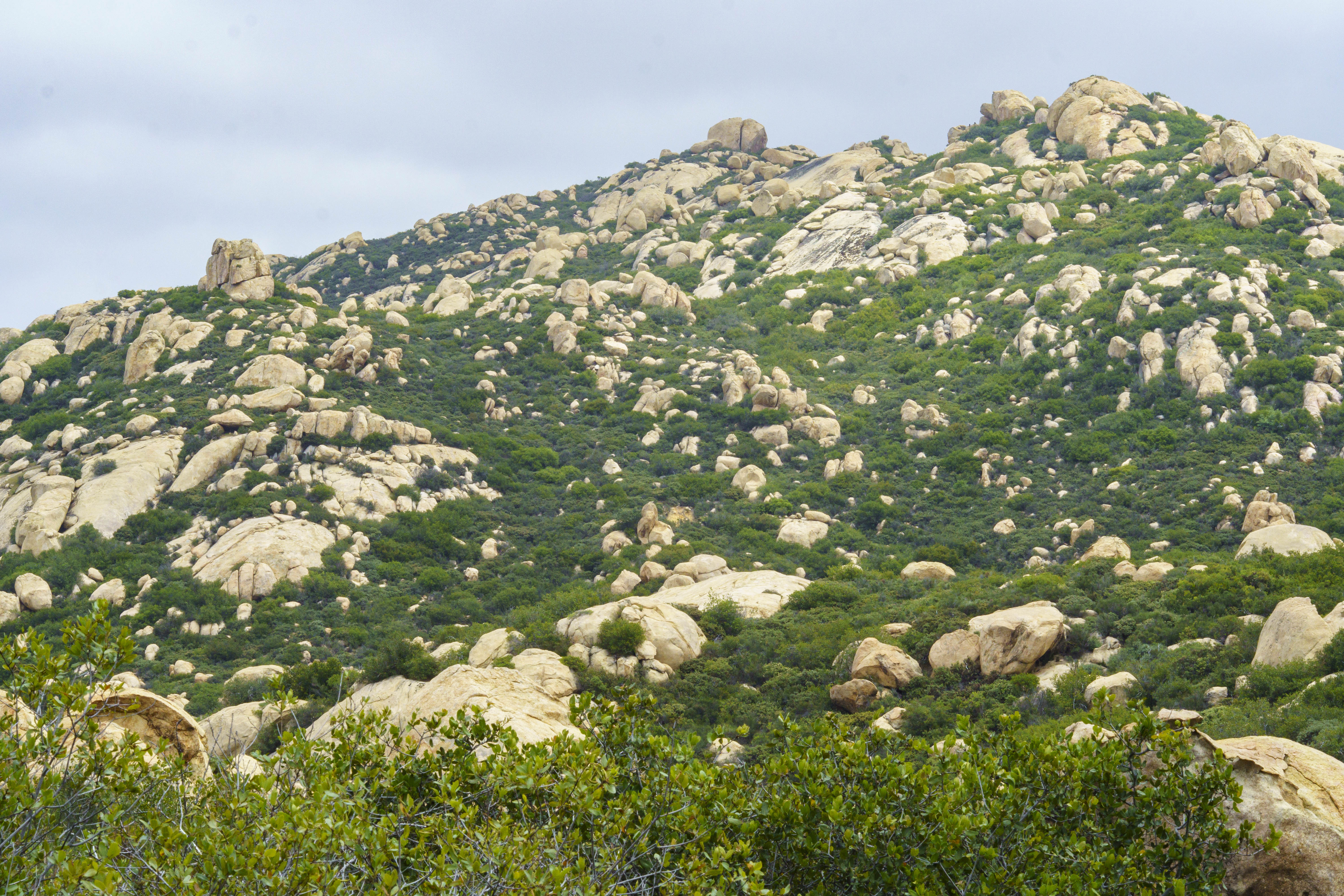
The granitic landscapes atop El Cajon Mountain

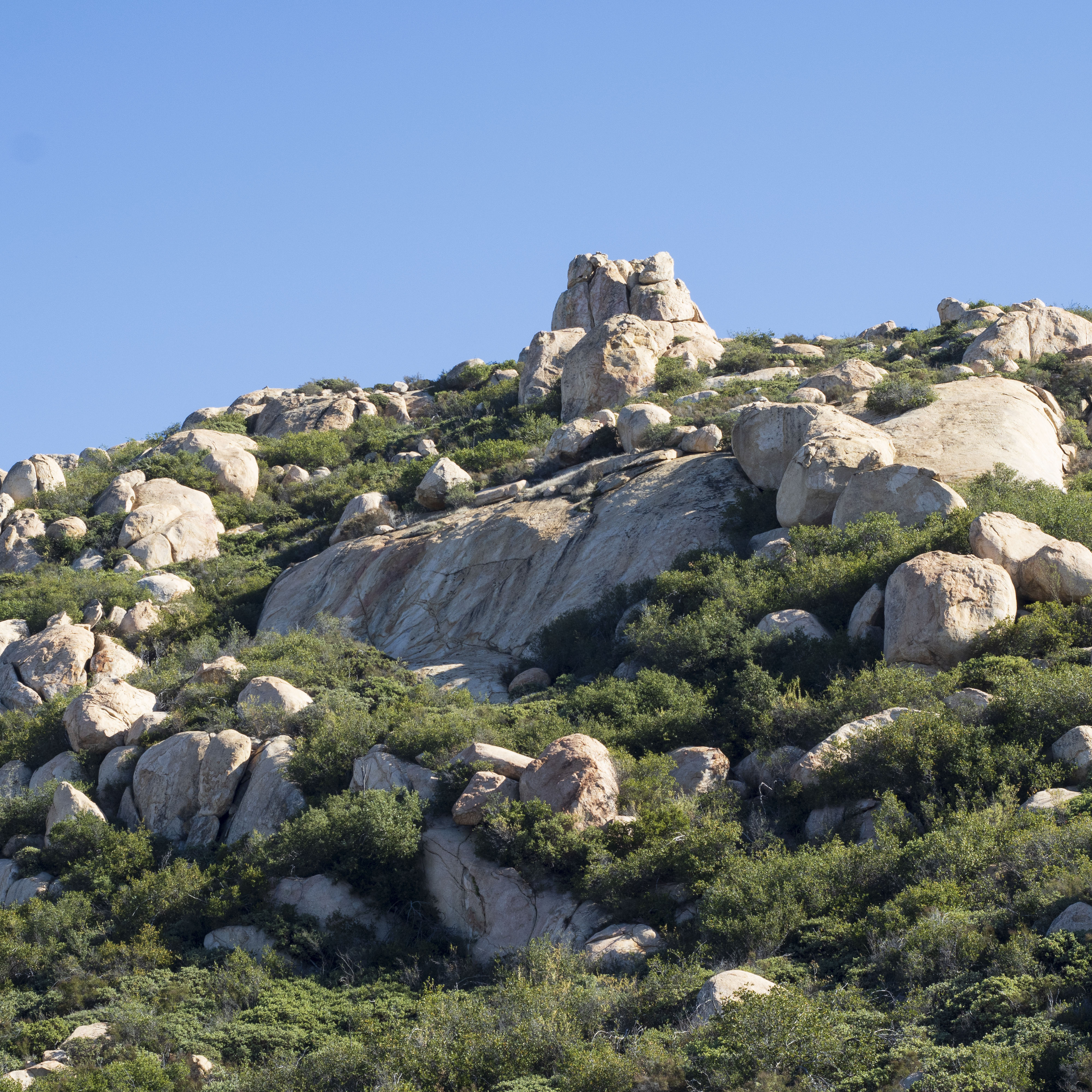
Detail of the landscape near the summit

== See also ==
- Cleveland National Forest
