= Paleo-climate of the Snake River Plain =

The paleo-climate of the Snake River Plain in southern Idaho, U.S., was much wetter and milder than today’s climate. During the Pliocene, the presence of a large lake provided habitat for fish. As the climate started to dry during the Pleistocene, vegetation similar to the present-day flora developed, although its geographical distribution was markedly different. Further drying occurred during the North American glaciation period that followed, resulting in the general aridity of the region today.

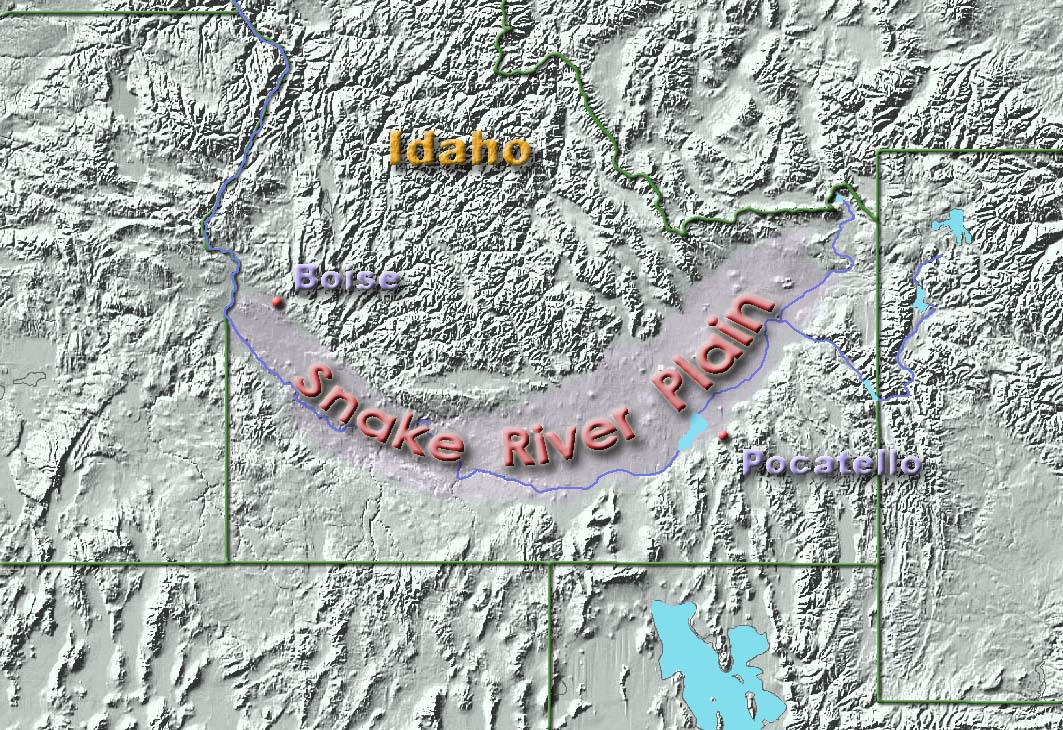
Snake River Plain in Idaho

== Pliocene ==
The Snake River Plain of 4 million years ago in the Pliocene differed greatly from today. With respect to climate, there was much lower temperature seasonality and the humidity was much higher. Much of the western Plain was submerged under the waters of Lake Idaho, which encompassed an area as large as Lake Ontario and covered the low elevation areas between Twin Falls and Hells Canyon. Summers were milder and winters were warmer with an estimated annual temperature gradient of 10°–25 °C. These conditions allowed for fish assemblages that are not observable in this area today.

=== Evidence ===
Researchers Smith & Patterson analyzed sediment samples from the western Plain's Chalk Hills Formation and found the fossilized inner-ear bones (otoliths) of sunfish to contain hints about the region's climate past. Two characteristics of the fossil offer a proxy for temperature and moisture conditions: 1) width of the bone's growth bands (length of growing season) and the δ^{18}O isotope composition (moisture source for lake waters).

The growth band widths of the bone indicated that the growing season, or annual period of relatively warm weather, was much longer than it is today. A very low δ^{18}O value was also found within the bone indicating that the predominant source of moisture for the ancient lake was high-elevation snow run-off which experienced low evaporation rates after entering the lake's waters. This moisture source is not unlike the moisture source of today but due to more equitable seasonal temperatures and thus less evaporation in the summers, lakes reached greater depth over time than they would today. This may be a contributing factor to the ‘disharmonious assemblage’ that Smith & Patterson found among the fossil record for the Pliocene epoch. Sunfish and catfish were occupying the same waters, albeit different depths, as sculpins and trout at the same time. Sculpins reportedly went extinct at approximately 2 million years ago in this lake which may provide a signal for heightened summer temperatures and thus an increase in deep, cold-water temperatures in the ancient lake.

The annual climate regime for much of the Pliocene era (5.3 Mya–2.58 Mya) on the Snake River Plain was analogous to the contemporary, upper Sacramento Valley of central California with an annual temperature range of approximately 0°-21 °C.

== Pleistocene ==
Following the Pliocene was the Pleistocene which marked the beginning of a drying trend that has lasted the last two million years. The vegetation of the early Pleistocene on the Plain was similar to modern-day flora but with notably different geographic distributions. Conifer woodland and sagebrush occupied much of the western Snake River Plain but the clear difference was the relative abundance of conifers at low elevations competing for the moist soils surrounding the several lakes of the area.

=== Evidence ===
Sediment samples taken from a site near Bruneau, Idaho retrieved pollen records for the purpose of analyzing the shift in vegetation proportions at the Pliocene-Pleistocene transition. The steady decline of pine and spruce species was found to be evident as early as the beginning of the Pliocene (represented by the region's Glenns Ferry formation). As pollen records marched forward through time, it also become evident that sagebrush (Artemisia) and chenopods (regional species belonging to the families Chenopodiaceae and Amaranthaceae) were increasing in frequency near the Bruneau site. Oak and hemlock species were also found in Pliocene-era pollen records, and their absence in Pleistocene records has led climatologists to hypothesize that their absence is indicative of a moisture decrease from the Pliocene to the Pleistocene.

A cooling, drying trend has been interpreted from the Bruneau, Idaho sediment core. As this trend unfolded, woodland-arid steppe oscillations began to occur across thousands of years with the sagebrush steppe ultimately succeeding.

=== A glaciation signal? ===
The Pleistocene-era Bruneau formation represents the time period from approximately 1.67 Mya to 1.5 Mya which matches up with the period believed to mark the onset of glaciation of the North American Intermountain West. With glaciation comes drier and colder atmospheric circulation which may help to explain the downfall of the conifer woodland at low elevations of the Snake River Plain.

== Last Glacial Maximum ==
During the peak of the last glaciation, wind direction and path was greatly altered due to the presence of the Cordilleran and Laurentide ice sheets. The position of these glaciers diverted the Pacific westerlies, which are and have been the dominant source of atmospheric moisture for the Plain, and introduced dry easterlies into the region. Sea-surface temperatures are estimated to have been roughly 6°-7 °C cooler and annual average atmospheric temperatures in the region 4°-5 °C cooler than at present.

=== Evidence ===
A study published in 2008 reported the climate estimations described above with reference to several δ^{18}O and δ^{2}H isotope measurements from four groundwater systems in the Boise, Idaho area. The four systems were selected based on the time period that they represent. Together, these groundwater systems provide a proxy for western Plain humidity and temperature over the past 30 thousand years.

== Holocene ==
Broadly, the Holocene epoch has been an era of aridity on the Snake River Plain. The drying trend observed in the Pleistocene pollen records at the Bruneau site continued throughout the last major glaciation of North America and into the current interglacial period. Today's climate and vegetation qualities on the Plain are largely similar to the region's conditions over the last 11,000 years.

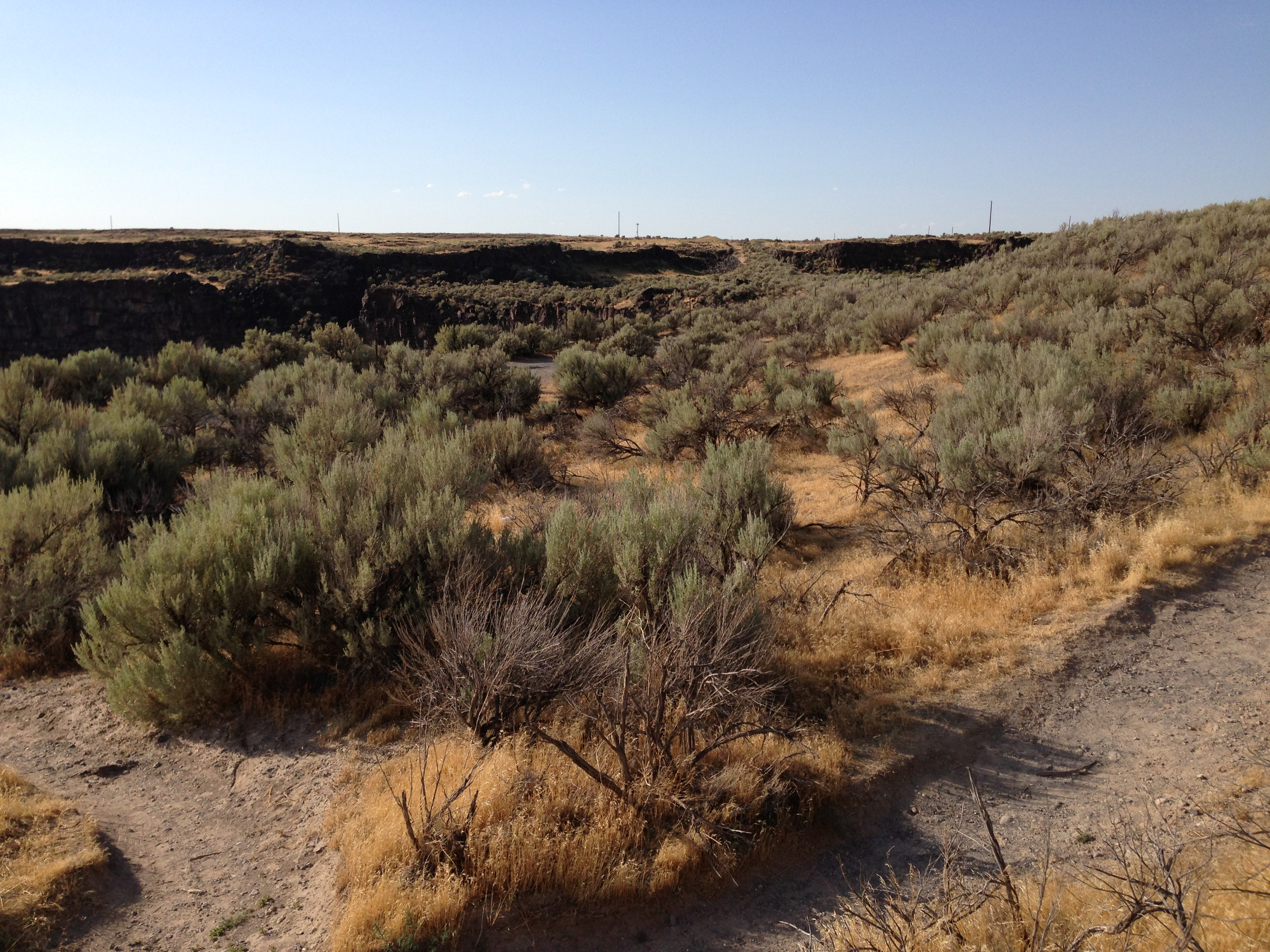
Natural vegetation on the Snake River Plain near Shoshone Falls in Idaho

Pollen records representing the majority of the Holocene (10 Kya – 3.5 Kya) show a peak in shadscale steppe conditions between 10 and 8 Kya. Shadscale steppe is dominated by low-growing Chenopod shrubs and flourish in conditions slightly drier than sagebrush steppe. These shrubs were prevalent at their highest elevations ever recorded for the Plain indicating a period of relatively low moisture. However, another study consisting of several sediment samples on the eastern Plain within the boundaries of the Idaho National Engineering Laboratory (INEL) indicate a time of peak aridity correlating to the time of the Mt. Mazama eruption approximately 7,700 years ago. This peak was also inferred by a high prevalence in Chenopod pollen found at the INEL sites for that time period.

Severe drought episodes are estimated to have occurred throughout the Holocene epoch. Sediment cores from Wyoming's Yellowstone Lake and carbon-dated bison remains found in lava tubes on the eastern Plain have helped to illustrate this dry history. Yellowstone Lake serves as the main water source for the Columbia-Snake drainage system and thus provides context for the Plain's hydrologic history. A cumulative decrease of approximately 60 cm has been inferred for the time period between 9.13 Kya and 8.78 Kya according to sediment analysis. The same study yielded estimates of more than 50 "drought years" per century from 1.38 Kya to 1.29 Kya.

Bison remains were stored by indigenous human groups in lava tubes as an act of preservation. These tubes maintain temperatures below 0 °C throughout the year and thus acted as freezers for bison meat in times of bison scarcity likely due to hotter, drier-than-normal periods of time during the Holocene epoch. Relative to all radiocarbon-dated remains excavated between 1987 and 2004, extremely high amounts of remains were found to be stored at a) 900 years ago, b) 2-3 Kya, c) 4-5 Kya and at d) 7-8 Kya implying that these may have been some of the driest and hottest events on the Snake River Plain in recent history.
