= Hanford Reach =

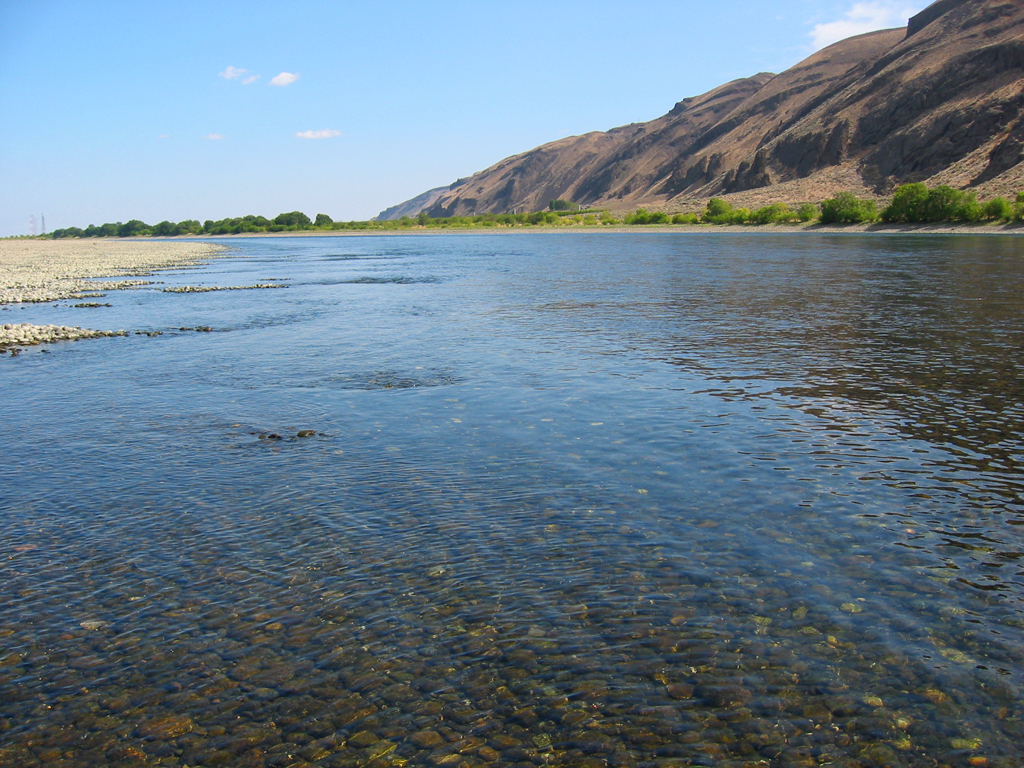
- A section of the Hanford Reach

Location
- Country: United States
- State: Washington

Physical characteristics
- Source: Base of Priest Rapids Dam
  - location: Near Desert Aire
  - coordinates: 46°38′35″N 119°54′39″W
  - elevation: 443 ft (135 m)
- Mouth: Lake Wallula
  - location: Richland
  - coordinates: 46°16′46″N 119°16′03″W
  - elevation: 340 ft (100 m)
- Length: 45 mi (72 km)
- Basin size: 96,000 mi^{2} (250,000 km^{2})
- Discharge
  - location: below Priest Rapids Dam
  - average: 118,400 cu ft/s (3,350 m^{3}/s)
  - minimum: 20,000 cu ft/s (570 m^{3}/s)
  - maximum: 547,400 cu ft/s (15,500 m^{3}/s)

Basin features
- River system: the Columbia River

The Hanford Reach is a free-flowing section of the Columbia River, around 51 miles (82 km) long, in eastern Washington state. It is named after a large northward bend in the river's otherwise southbound course.

Hanford Reach is the only section of the Columbia in the United States that is not tidal nor part of a reservoir, excluding a short reach between the Canada–United States border and the upper end of Franklin D. Roosevelt Lake, the reservoir of Grand Coulee Dam. Much of the Hanford Reach flows through the Hanford Site, a nuclear production facility established during World War II. It is also the site of the Hanford Reach National Monument, created from the original protection area around the Hanford Site. Upstream of the Hanford Reach is Priest Rapids Dam and downstream is the McNary Dam, which also impounds the last stretch of the Snake River, the largest tributary of the Columbia.

The Hanford Reach includes the still extant Coyote Rapids and supports over forty species of fish including significant numbers of spawning fall chinook salmon

== See also ==
- Locke Island
- Ringold Formation
- Savage Island
