= Puma incurva =

Puma incurva Temporal range: Early Pleistocene ~2.25–1.8 Ma

Scientific classification
- Kingdom: Animalia
- Phylum: Chordata
- Class: Mammalia
- Order: Carnivora
- Family: Felidae
- Genus: Puma
- Species: †P. incurva

Binomial name
- †Puma incurva (Ewer, 1956)

Synonyms
- Panthera pardus incurva Ewer, 1956

Extinct species of felid

Puma incurva is an extinct species in genus Puma. It was described based on fossils from the Early Pleistocene-aged Swartkrans site in South Africa.

== Taxonomy & evolution ==
Puma incurva was initially described in 1956 as an extinct subspecies of leopard under the name Panthera pardus incurva. It was generally accepted under that name until a review of the material in 2023 noted that, while certain features of the fossils were unusual for a leopard, they were much more similar to members of the genus Puma, and reassigned the subspecies to that genus as a full genus. It is hypothesized that P. incurva may have been the result of hybridization between Puma and Panthera (such as lions and leopards). Material includes a nearly complete but badly crushed skull.

== Description ==
Puma incurva was a leopard-sized cat. The skull is mostly Puma-like, but the upper carnassial is Panthera-like.
