= Locke Island =

River island in Washington, United States

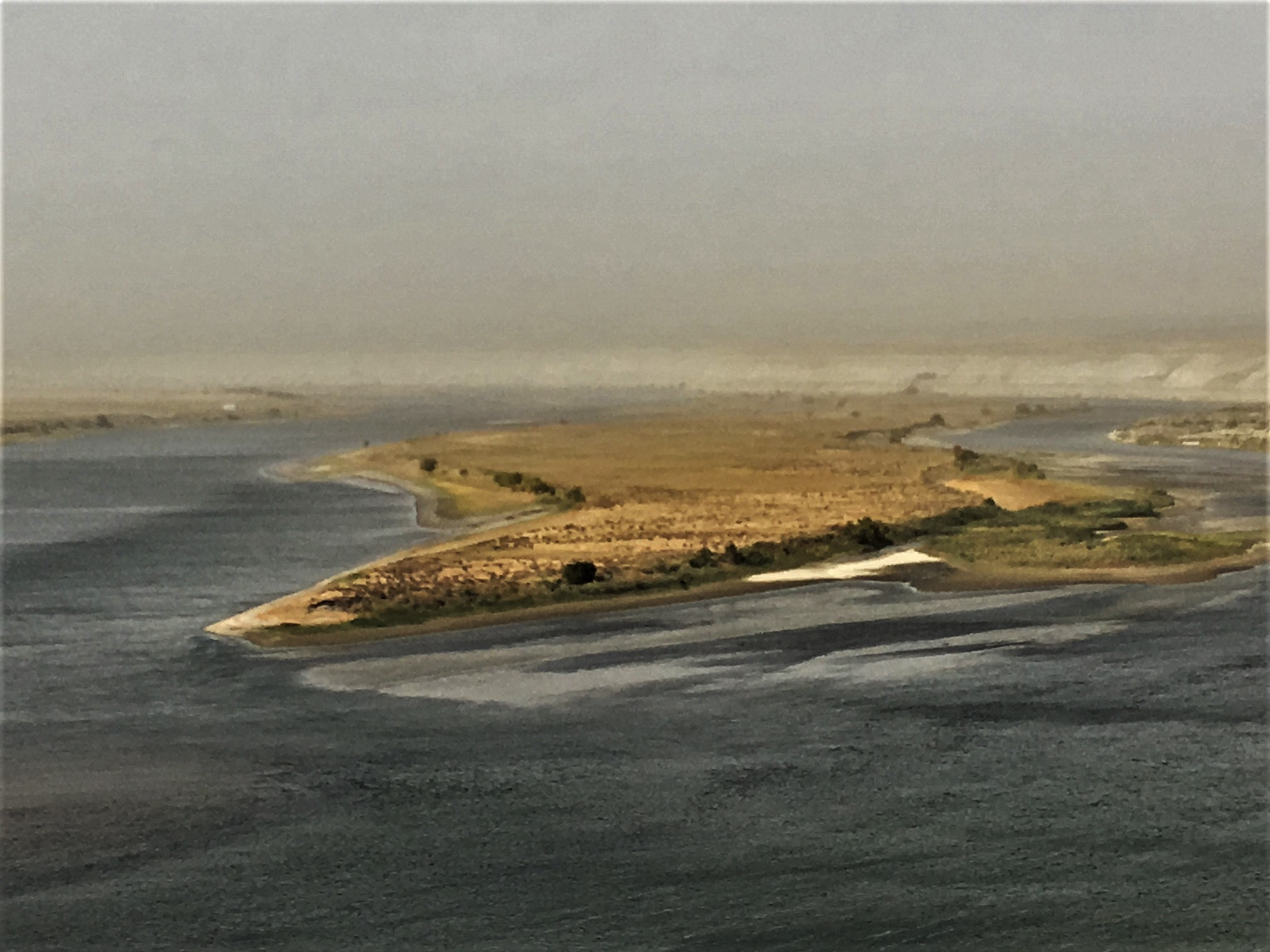
- The southern tip of Locke Island seen from the White Bluffs

- Location within Washington (state)

Geography
- Location: Columbia River, Hanford Reach National Monument, Washington
- Coordinates: 46°42′19″N 119°28′03″W
- Highest elevation: 397 ft (121 m)

Administration
- United States
- State: Washington
- County: Grant County

Locke Island is an island located in the Hanford Reach of the Columbia River in Washington, United States. The island is protected as part of the Hanford Reach National Monument, which was created out of lands surrounding the Hanford Site. The island is an important archeological site and is on the National Register of Historic Places. These cultural resources are being threatened by erosion resulting from a landslide changing the river's course.

== History ==
Human habitation and use of Locke Island has varied significantly throughout time. Before the arrival of European settlers, Native Americans used the island and areas around it for fishing and other river-based activities. Use of the island largely ceased as Americans moved into the region and began to farm on both sides of the Columbia River, establishing the town of White Bluffs on the Benton County side of the river. This town, which was only a few miles south of Locke Island, was abandoned when the Hanford Site was constructed under the Manhattan Project.

=== Indigenous Use ===
Locke Island is located near the former sites of several Native American fishing sites that were primarily used by the Yakama, Nez Perce, and ancestors of the Wanapum. Two of these were called Tah-Koot and Wy-Yow-Na. Many of the people who fished in the area would camp on the island itself, with others traveling to the area from as far as Idaho to trade. Typically visitors who were not members of the tribes that frequented Tah-Koot and Wy-Yow-Na did not fish. According to a Native American who spoke with researchers in the early-20th century, most families who came to the area to fish would catch an average of 300 fish during their time there. Celebrations would occur in the campsites as late as 1904.

Artifacts found on the island indicate a long and consistent period of human activity on the island. Erosion during the wet season of 1996–1997 unearthed material that had previously lain 4 meters (13 ft) below the island's surface, indicating the presence of people as early as 2,000 years ago. Other material has been dated to being as recent as the 19th century. Obsidian cutting tools and arrowheads are abundant on the island.

The lands were ceded to the United States in the treaty signed by the Umatilla and Yakama Tribes at the Walla Walla Council in 1855.

=== Abandonment ===
As white settlers moved into the Columbia Basin, Native Americans found less use for Locke Island and the surrounding fish encampments. The increasing settlers had a significant impact on the ecology of the river through over fishing and constructing dams. No roads or structures were built on the island, though ranching and farming did occur nearby. This was especially true on the Benton County side of the river, with the town of White Bluffs only being a few miles to the south.

The island became part of an involuntary park when the Hanford Site was created under the Manhattan Project in the 1940s. Residents were forced from the area so the federal government could construct the site, which was used to make nuclear weapons. The site was surrounded by a wide security buffer to prevent information about the secret project from being leaked. As part of this buffer, Locke Island remained undeveloped. Much of the security buffer, including Locke Island, was placed in Hanford Reach National Monument in 2000 and continues to be closed to the public.

== Geology ==
The island consists of alluvium that has been deposited by the Columbia River since the Pleistocene and overlies the Columbia River Basalt Group. Much of this is eroded remains of the Ringold Formation, which was placed by the Columbia River between 9 and 3 million years ago. The White Bluffs, which are a series of cliffs created by this erosion, are immediately east of the island.

The White Bluffs became destabilized by water from the Columbia Basin Irrigation Project entering the groundwater system and flowing toward the Columbia River. This destabilization has caused portions of the cliff to slump into the river, including a large one at Locke Island. This slump has narrowed the eastern passage of the Columbia as it flows around the island, increasing erosion of the middle section of the island. In some locations, up to 40 meters (130 ft) of the island's material on its eastern side has been removed by the river since 1996. The slump began sliding into the river in the 1970s, but has not moved appreciably since 1998. This erosion threatens the cultural artifacts left by millennia of human habitation before European settlement as well as salmon spawning sites downstream.

== Ecology ==
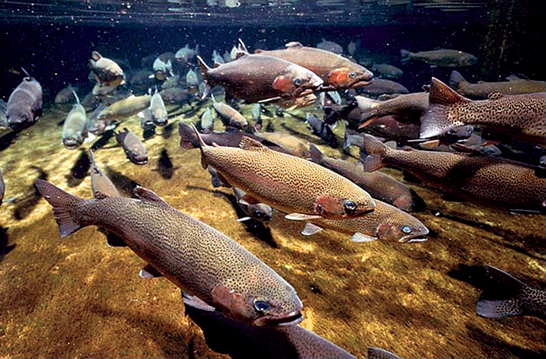
Salmon in the Columbia River adjacent to Locke Island

Locke Island is located in the shrub-steppe region in the rain shadow of the Cascade Range. As such, its climate is characterized by low precipitation and extreme temperatures. While this was once an important salmon habitat, no salmon were observed to be spawning around the island as recently as 1999. Up to 81% of the area around the island seems conducive to spawning salmon. Canada geese were also once abundant on Locke Island, with 129 nests having been counted on the island in 1957. Coyotes have limited the goose population in recent years so that numbers of successful nests have been kept to less than ten per year for several decades. The coyote population on Locke Island is unique among other islands in the Hanford Reach in that coyotes reside on the island rather than just being visitors. The island also supports deer and eagles.

Flora on the island are similar to other regions of Eastern Washington and consist primarily of native grasses and short shrubs like sagebrush. This vegetation provides habitat for animals living on the island and is threatened by invasive species.

== See also ==
- Savage Island
