= Lake Idaho =

- Map showing the approximate location and size of Lake Idaho with modern cities and rivers.

- Location within North America
- Location: Idaho and Oregon, United States
- Coordinates: 43°N 116°W
- Lake type: former lake
- Primary outflows: Ancestral Snake River, evaporation
- Basin countries: United States
- Max. length: 150 mi (240 km)
- Max. width: 40 mi (64 km)

Lake Idaho was a lake covering what is now the western Snake River Plain of Idaho and Eastern Oregon, including overlaying the location where Boise, Idaho now stands. The lake is estimated to have been extant between 10.1 and 2.5 million years ago and is identified as the source of sedimentary deposits in the Chalk Hills Formation and the Glenns Ferry Formation.

Eventually, the lake level rose to overtop a natural divide near what is now the Oregon-Idaho border north of Ontario, Oregon. This led to the formation of Hells Canyon, through which the Snake River flows between the Snake River Plain and the Columbia River today.

During the life of the lake system, Lake Idaho was at times an endorheic basin with no outlet to the ocean. Other periods may have seen it draining toward California, possibly as a tributary of the Sacramento River or Klamath River.

== Geology ==
=== Background ===
The eastern half of the Snake River Plain was largely formed by subsidence as the Yellowstone hotspot migrated northeastward relative to the North American plate. The western half of the plain, on the other hand, is an intracontinental rift valley bounded on the northeast and southwest by normal faults. This half is oriented along other regional fault systems, like the Olympic–Wallowa lineament, rather than the path of the Yellowstone hotspot.

The western plain is interpreted as a Basin and Range feature, though formation of the graben may have been triggered by the Yellowstone hotspot when it was located near this region. Research conducted in the 1980s and 1990s inferred formation of the valley around 17 to 16 million years ago. In the late 1990s, evidence from volcanic centers north of Boise showed a later date, closer to 9.5 million years ago.

Lake Idaho had two major phases of existence, the first between about 10.1 and 6.4 million years ago and later between 4.3 and 2.5 million years ago. Sedimentary deposits from these two periods are the Chalk Hills and Glenns Ferry formations, respectively.

During much of the existence of Lake Idaho, the water body was disconnected from the Columbia River system. Early theories suggested the ancestral Snake River may have exited Lake Idaho toward the northwest utilizing the Grande Ronde River system. Fossils around the lake and in the Columbia Basin of Eastern Washington have led to this theory falling out of favor.

=== Early phase ===
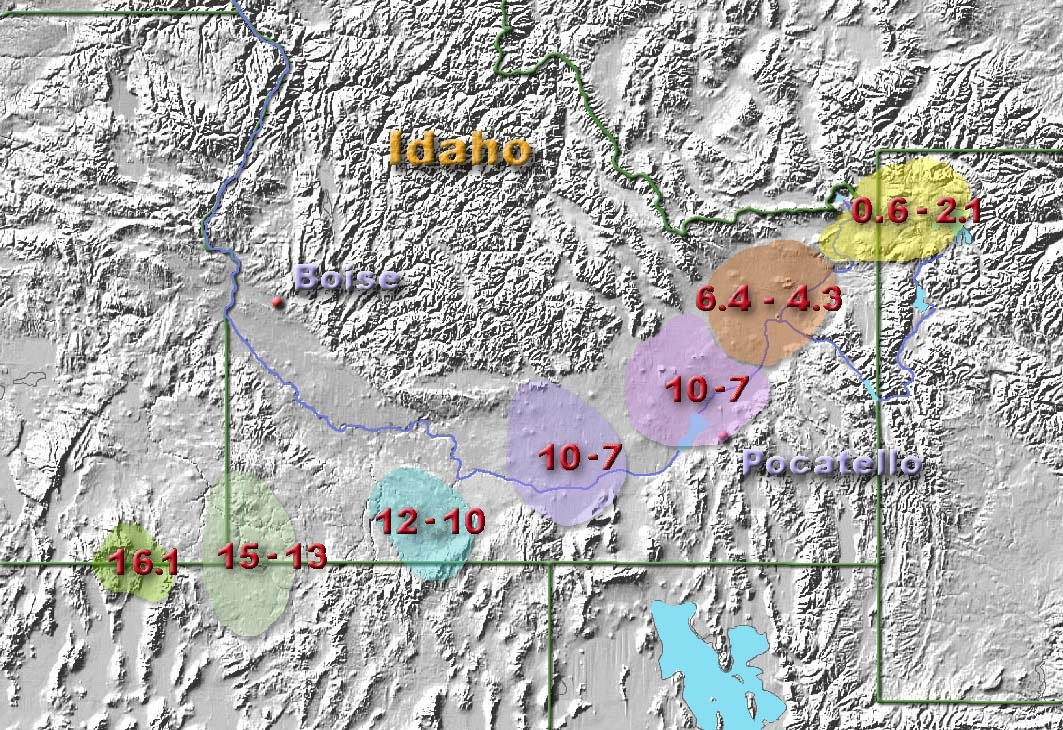
Location of Yellowstone hotspot eruptive centers with dates listed as millions of years old.

For the oldest phase of Lake Idaho's existence, water likely flowed outward from it toward Nevada and California via an ancestral Snake River that was a tributary of the Sacramento or Klamath Rivers. Direct evidence for the pathway is largely obscured due to later features in the region, such as lacustrine sediments from Lake Lahontan which formed in the Great Basin during the Last Glacial Maximum.

Yellowstone hotspot eruptions at the Picabo and Heise calderas in the central and eastern Snake River Plain caused the Upper Snake River to be disconnected from Lake Idaho. Water originating from the area of the Teton Range may have reached the Columbia River via a route crossing Western Montana and the Idaho panhandle around 7 million years ago.

=== Late phase ===
Uplift in the Great Basin cut Lake Idaho's drainage off from the Pacific Ocean leading to a period when Lake Idaho was an endorheic basin similar to the Great Salt Lake in Utah today. The Glenns Ferry Formation from the later phase of Lake Idaho exhibits shoreline sand that may indicate the lake was alkaline during that period.

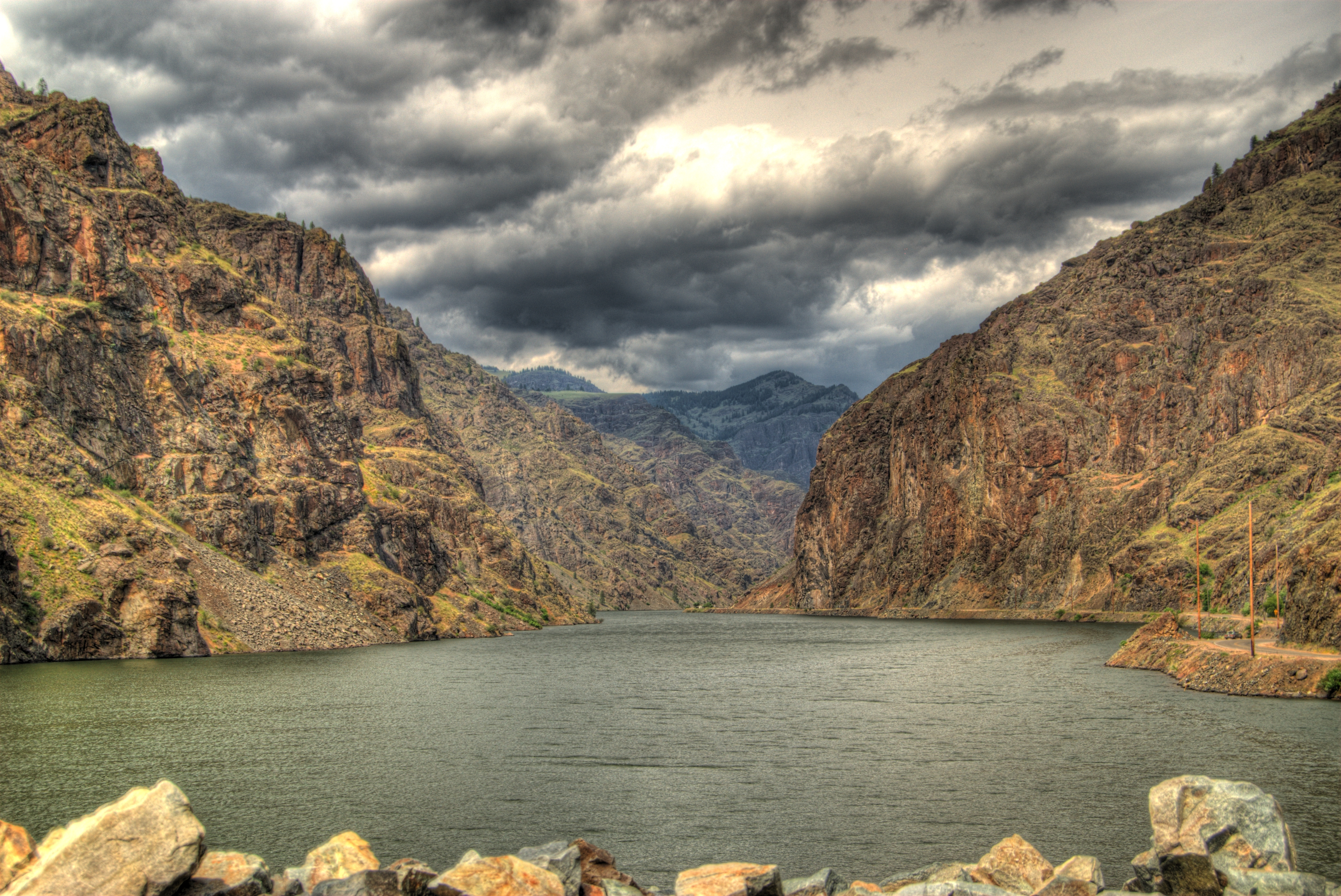
The Snake River flowing through Hells Canyon.

Subsidence occurred at the Picabo and Heise eruptive centers between 5 and 3.3 million years ago as the Yellowstone hotspot continued to migrate northeastward relative to North America. This uplift diverted the Upper Snake River into Lake Idaho's drainage basin potentially adding as much as 50,000 km^{2} (19,000 mi^{2}) to Lake Idaho's watershed. Other rivers also experienced changes as the Yellowstone hotspot moved the Continental Divide eastward contributing to the rise in lake level.

Once the Upper Snake basin was captured, Lake Idaho's surface elevation rose to around 3,600 ft (1,100 m) above sea level until around 3 million years ago when it overtopped the drainage divide separating it from the Columbia River watershed. Hells Canyon was carved through the mountainous terrain with the Snake River draining Lake Idaho and carrying water to the Columbia River and Pacific Ocean. This series of events predate the Bonneville flood by millions of years.

== Ecology ==
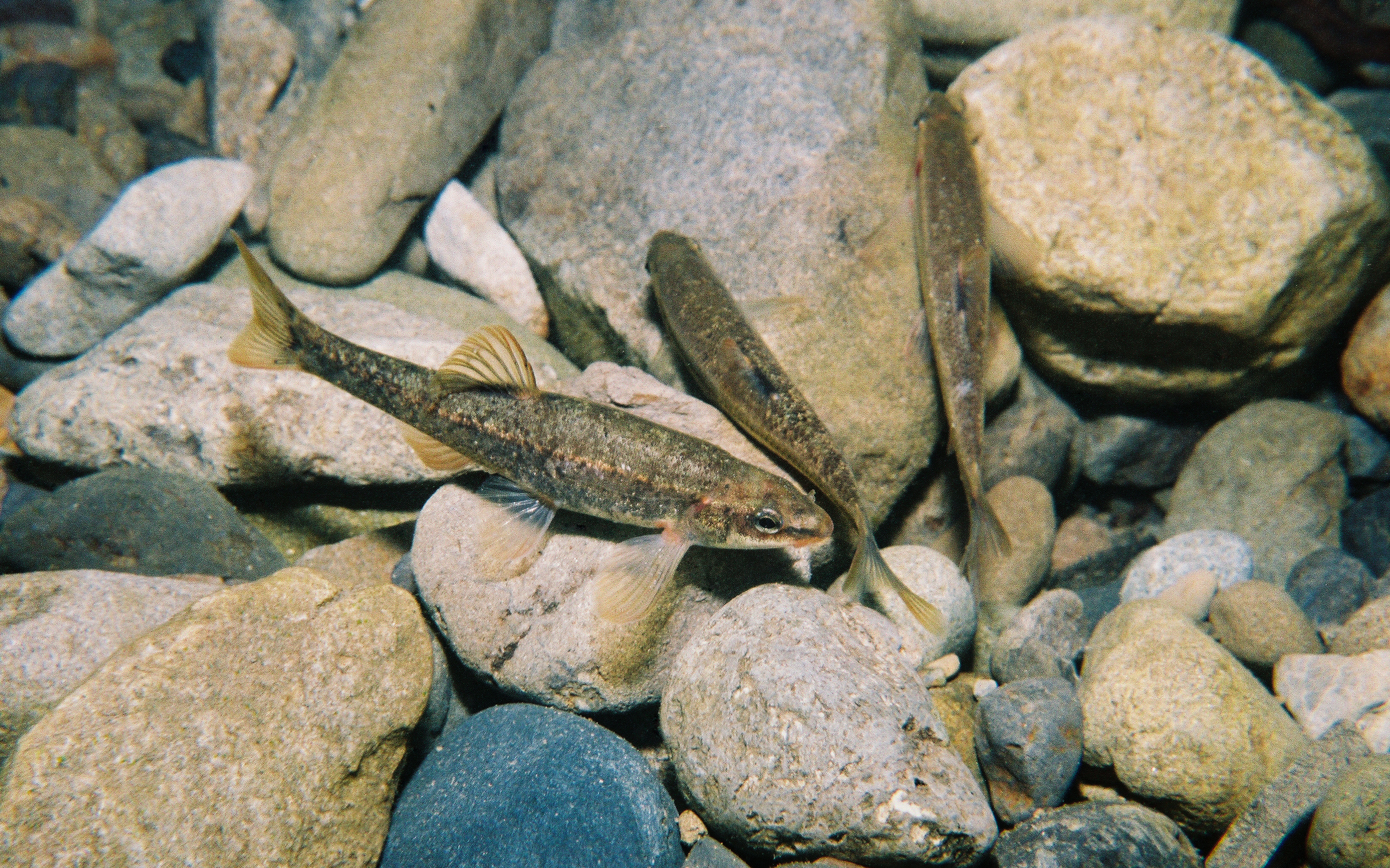
Speckled dace continue to be found in the former Lake Idaho watershed.

Fossil fish species found in and around the western Snake River Plain dating from the time of Lake Idaho support the idea that the region was not connected to the Columbia River for most of the duration of the water body. Analysis of DNA from Rhinichthys fossils in the region have similarities to those found around the former extent of Lake Lahontan and Eastern California.

Further similarities in Rhinichyhys DNA was discovered between the Lake Idaho region and the Colorado River watershed. A 2004 paper suggested this as being evidence that Lake Idaho could at one time have been connected to the Colorado system.

Today, populations of speckled dace above natural barriers like Shoshone Falls remain distinct from those below it and are more closely related to those in the northern Bonneville Basin, such as the Bear River watershed. This supports the notion that Lake Idaho and its watershed was separate from the Columbia River for a significant period of time.

== See also ==
- Ringold Formation
