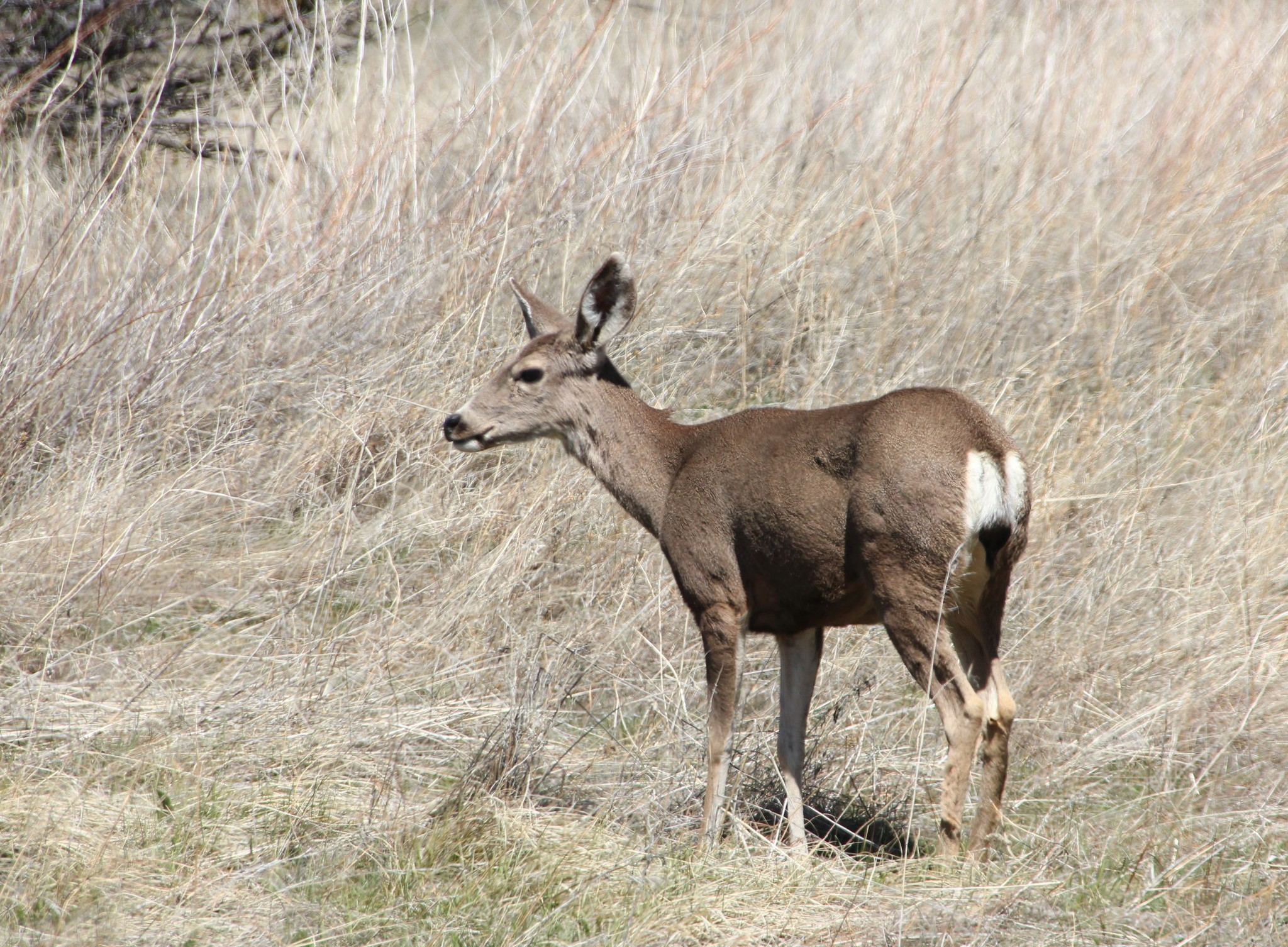
- Doe from Stonewall Mine, San Diego County

Scientific classification
- Kingdom: Animalia
- Phylum: Chordata
- Class: Mammalia
- Order: Artiodactyla
- Family: Cervidae
- Subfamily: Capreolinae
- Genus: Odocoileus
- Species: O. hemionus
- Subspecies: O. h. fuliginatus

Trinomial name
- Odocoileus hemionus fuliginatus Cowan, 1933

= Southern mule deer =

Subspecies of deer

The southern mule deer (Odocoileus hemionus fuliginatus) is a subspecies of mule deer endemic to the Californias. They are found along the Mexico-United States border, from Southern California into Baja California.

It is similar to the California mule deer in size, and intergrades with it where their ranges overlap.

== Taxonomy ==
In 1933, Ian McTaggart-Cowan described the southern mule deer as a subspecies of the mule deer from a San Diego County specimen. He gave it the trinomial name Odocoileus hemionus fuliginatus.

=== Evolution ===
Deer are first represented in the North American fossil record with Eocoileus gentryorum. The oldest remains of this species date to 5 million years ago and were found in deposits from Florida. The Pliocene Bretzia pseudalces was another early North American deer species, and its remains were found in 4.8–3.4 million year old Nebraska deposits.

A study of mitochondrial DNA suggests modern mule deer diverged from white-tailed deer approximately 3.13 million years ago and had a hybridisation event 1.32 million years ago.

== Description ==
This subspecies is a dark-coloured deer with a near-black mid-dorsal line and a black dorsal tail stripe. Southern mule deer have dark spots on the lateral areas of the lower lip. The fur colouration of southern mule deer resembles that of the Cedros Island mule deer, endemic to Cedros Island in Baja California.

These deer are usually the same size as the California mule deer. The metatarsal gland is 60 mm (6 cm).

== Range ==
The southern mule is endemic to the states of California and Baja California. To the north, it ranges to Orange County, where it intergrades with the California mule deer. Even though most mule deer of the San Gabriel Mountains are California mule deer, a young adult buck killed by a car in 1951 showed pelage characteristics of southern mule deer. This suggests mule deer of the eastern San Antonio Canyon region are southern mule deer.
