= Puma pumoides =

Puma pumoides Temporal range: 3.0–2.5 Ma Late Pliocene

Scientific classification
- Kingdom: Animalia
- Phylum: Chordata
- Class: Mammalia
- Order: Carnivora
- Family: Felidae
- Genus: Puma
- Species: †P. pumoides

Binomial name
- †Puma pumoides (Castellanos, 1956)

Synonyms
- Felis pumoides Castellanos, 1956; Puma (Herpailurus) pumoides

Extinct species of felid

Puma pumoides is an extinct prehistoric cat that was described in 1956 by Alfredo Castellanos using the scientific name Felis pumoides. Castellanos excavated its fossil remains in the Reartes Valley located in the province of Córdoba, Argentina in a stratum called 'Brocherense bed', which probably dates to the Pliocene.

== Description ==
Fossil remains consisted of a maxilla, the orbital section of the frontal bone, a part of a mandible, a petrosal, a femur, a lumbar vertebrae, and a few parts of each a humerus, tibia, ulna, and radius. Because of the similarity of these holotype parts with the living jaguarundi, it was preliminarily subordinated to the genus Puma.
