= Bretzia nebrascensis =

Bretzia nebrascensis Temporal range: Late Pleistocene - Holocene

Scientific classification
- Kingdom: Animalia
- Phylum: Chordata
- Class: Mammalia
- Order: Artiodactyla
- Family: Cervidae
- Subfamily: Capreolinae
- Genus: †Bretzia
- Species: †B. nebrascensis

Binomial name
- †Bretzia nebrascensis Gunnell & Foral, 1994

Extinct species of deer

Bretzia nebrascensis was an extinct species of deer that lived in North America (Nebraska, South Dakota) during the Pleistocene and Early Holocene, as recently as 10,000 BP.

The antlers of B. nebrascensis were noticeably different from those of its earlier relative, Bretzia pseudalces, primarily in the height of antler beams from burr to brow tines, and the absence of a beaded burr.

== Diet ==
The species B. nebrascensis, like modern deer, was a herbivorous ungulate, feeding on either grassy areas, bushes and any other plant material it could find in many areas.

== Distribution ==
Bretzia nebrascensis mostly lived in large forested areas, especially lush areas, with a lot of food sources and water to drink from.

== Characteristics ==
Bretzia nebrascensis mostly had either medium sized antlers, while the females lacked them just like modern deer species. The size is assumed to be around the size of its sister species, Bretzia pseudalces.
