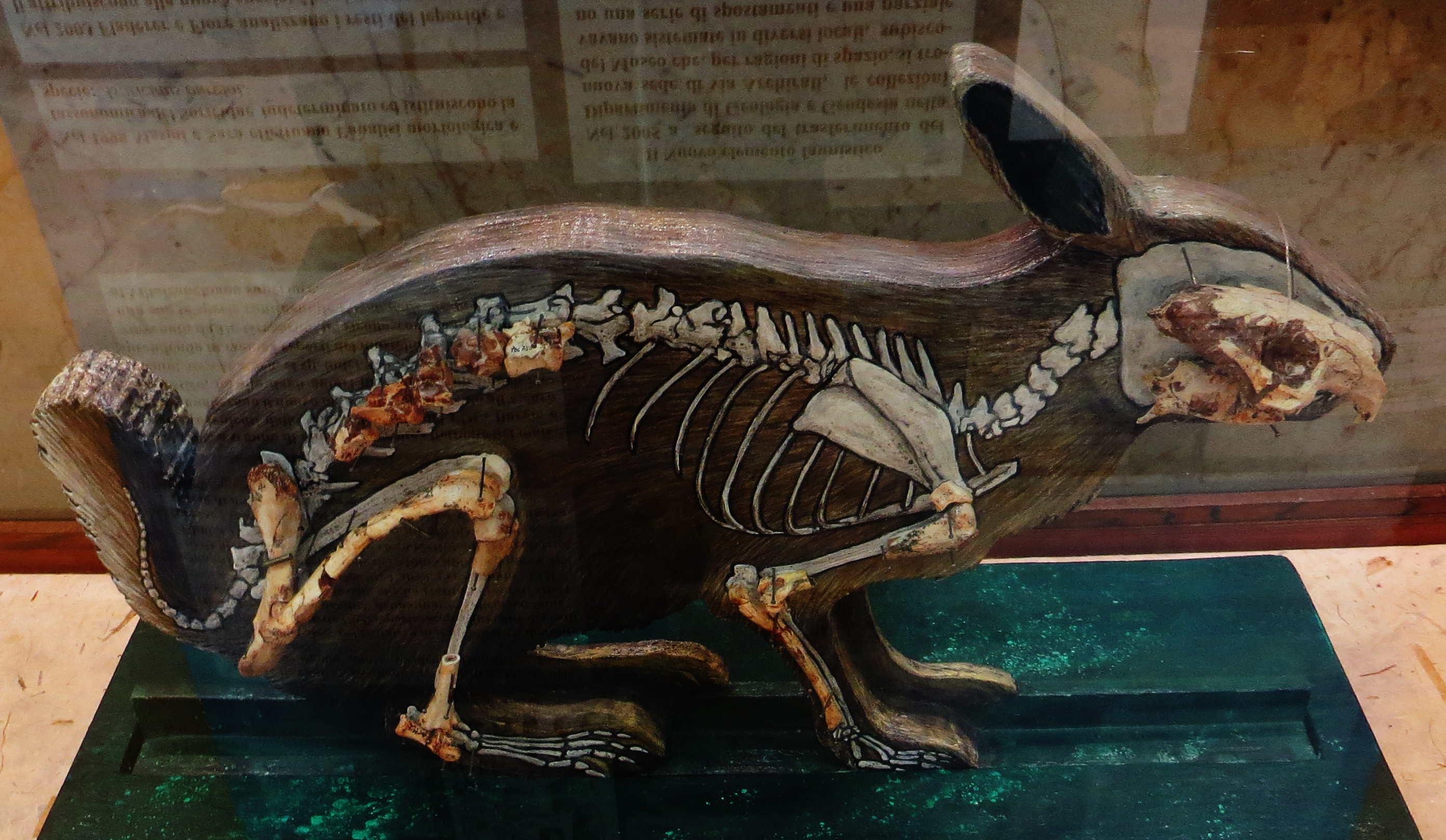
- Hypolagus peregrinus skeleton

Scientific classification
- Kingdom: Animalia
- Phylum: Chordata
- Class: Mammalia
- Order: Lagomorpha
- Family: Leporidae
- Genus: †Hypolagus; Dice, 1917

Type species
- †Hypolagus vetus Kellogg, 1910

Species
- See text

Synonyms
- Pliolagus

= Hypolagus =

Hypolagus Temporal range: Early Miocene to Middle Pleistocene

Extinct genus of lagomorph

Hypolagus is an extinct genus of lagomorph, first recorded in the Hemingfordian (early to middle Miocene) of North America. It entered Asia during the early Turolian and spread to Europe not much later, where it survived until the Middle Pleistocene. Though unknown in the Iberian Peninsula, fossils of this genus have been found in the Balearic Islands, suggesting an eastern migration during the dry period in the Mediterranean region known as the Messinian Salinity Crisis.

Hypolagus generally shows features intermediate between rabbits and hares. Hypolagus balearicus was the smallest species at 1.3–2.7 kg (2.9–6.0 lb) and showed several peculiar features, such as short elbow-to-humerus ratio and robustness of the ulna.

== Species ==
Many species of Hypolagus have been described, including 12 from North America. Some of these species may be synonymous with others.

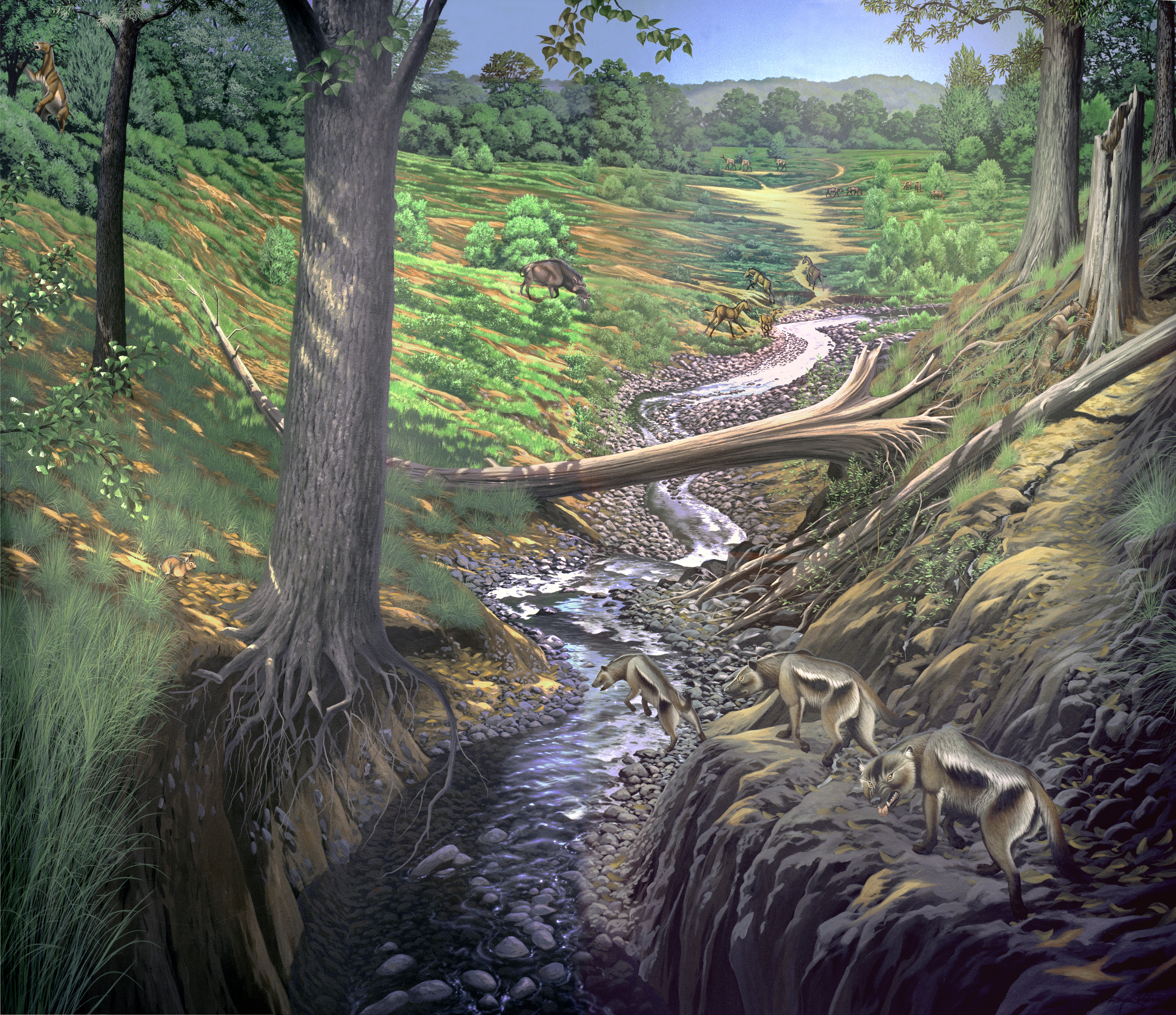
Restoration of Hypolagus (lower middle left) and other animals of the Haystack Assemblage

North American species

- Hypolagus arizonensis
- Hypolagus edensis - Late Pliocene
- Hypolagus fontinalis
- Hypolagus furlongi - Late Pliocene - Early Pleistocene
- Hypolagus gidleyi - Late Pliocene
- Hypolagus oregonensis
- Hypolagus parviplicatus
- Hypolagus regalis - Late Pliocene
- Hypolagus ringoldensis - Late Miocene to Early Pleistocene, Ringold Formation, Washington
- Hypolagus tedfordi- Late Pliocene
- Hypolagus vetus - Late Miocene
- Hypolagus voorhiesi - Late Pliocene

Eurasian species

- Hypolagus balearicus - Early Pliocene, Mallorca and possibly Ibiza
- Hypolagus brachygnathus - Late Pliocene to Middle Pleistocene, Europe
- Hypolagus gromovi - Late Turolian to Early Ruscinian, Caucasus region
- Hypolagus mazegouensis - Late Pliocene, China
- Hypolagus multiplicatus - Late Pliocene to Early Pleistocene, Baikal region
- Hypolagus peregrinus - Early Pleistocene, Sicily
- Hypolagus petenyii - Early Pliocene to Early Pleistocene, Europe
- Hypolagus schreuderae - Late Pliocene to Early Pleistocene, China
- Hypolagus transbaicalicus - Late Pliocene to Early Pleistocene, Baikal region

The genus and both species of Pliolagus (P. beremendensis and P. tothi) are junior synonyms of Hypolagus brachygnathus.
