= Bretzia pseudalces =

Bretzia pseudalces Temporal range: Early Pliocene ~4.9–3.6 Ma
- Reconstruction of Bretzia pseudalces skull and antlers

Scientific classification
- Kingdom: Animalia
- Phylum: Chordata
- Class: Mammalia
- Order: Artiodactyla
- Family: Cervidae
- Subfamily: Capreolinae
- Genus: †Bretzia
- Species: †B. pseudalces

Binomial name
- †Bretzia pseudalces Fry & Gustafson, 1974

Extinct species of deer

Bretzia pseudalces, is a species of deer from the extinct genus Bretzia It is endemic to North America, with fossils found in the Ringold Formation in Washington.

== Taxonomy and evolution ==
The genus Bretzia was named in 1974 by paleontologist Eric Paul Gustafson and his colleague Willis Fry. It was named after geologist J. Harlan Bretz. Bretzia pseudalces is notable for being one of the first deer to live in North America, and one of the earliest ancestors to all New World deer. Fossils of sister species Bretzia nebrascensis has been found in Nebraska and South Dakota.

== Description ==
Bretzia pseudalces is known from fossils of its jaws, teeth, leg bones, vertebrae, and antlers, and overall had approximately the same body size as a modern mule deer. However, it is easily distinguished by its dramatic antlers, which form a large palmate structure from a single anterior tine and posterior beam, superficially resembling a modern moose antlers.

== Paleoecology ==
Bretzia pseudalces fossils are found with Teleoceras, Platygonus and Megatylopus, indicating they lived in the same space. The environment would have been mild and temperate, but seasonal, allowing for water levels to rise and fall. The majority of B. pseudalces fossils recovered from White Bluffs in the Ringold formation were degraded to various degrees, and bones of fish and small rodents were most commonly found with them, indicating that they were buried in silt and mud from riparian areas, including marshes or oxbow lakes.
