= Savage Island (Washington) =

Island in Washington state, USA

Coordinates: 46°32′50″N 119°18′08″W

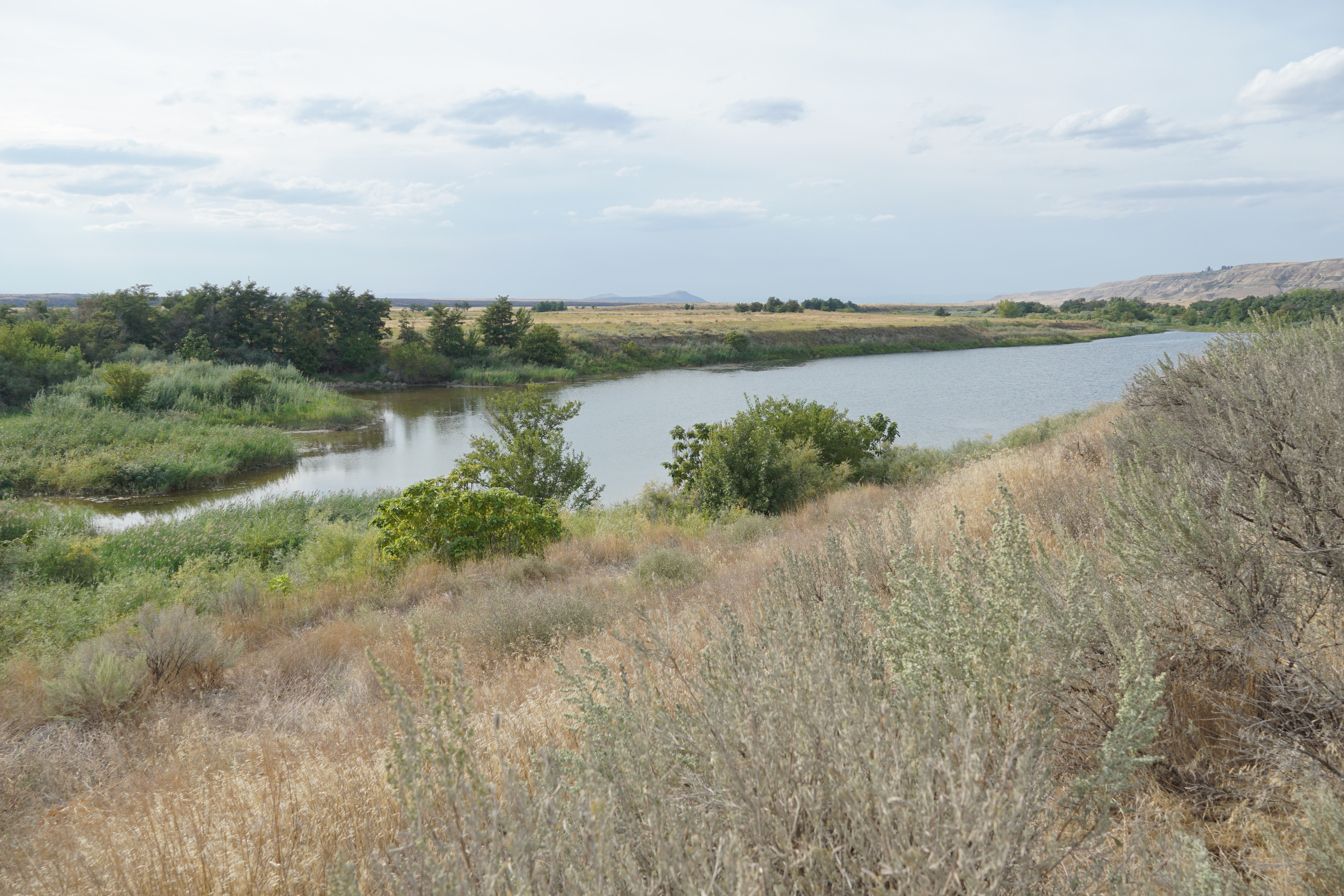
Savage Island, Washington State

Savage Island is an island on the Columbia River in the state of Washington, United States. It lies in a free-flowing stretch of the river known as the Hanford Reach.

The island is one of 16 islands in the River Corridor Unit, a section of the Hanford Reach National Monument which is managed by the United States Department of Energy rather than the Fish and Wildlife Service.

Historically, Savage Island has supported small farms and settlements. The Wanapum tribe were known to inhabit this particular region. The lands were part of the Manhattan Project buyout in 1943.

The wildlife of the island include mule deer, coyote, burrowing owl, and western diamondback rattlesnake; the island is primarily arid shrub steppe, with some wetland habitat by the shore of the river.

== Other geological features ==
Other interesting geological features of the area include the White Bluffs, as well across the river the Hanford Dunes.

== See also ==
- Locke Island
