= Bretzia =

Bretzia Temporal range: Early Pliocene-Holocene ~4.9–0.010 Ma

Scientific classification
- Kingdom: Animalia
- Phylum: Chordata
- Class: Mammalia
- Order: Artiodactyla
- Family: Cervidae
- Subfamily: Capreolinae
- Genus: †Bretzia; Fry and Gustafson, 1974

Species
- †Bretzia nebrascensis Gunnell and Foral, 1994 †Bretzia pseudalces Fry and Gustafson, 1974

Extinct species of deer

Bretzia is an extinct genus of deer that was endemic to North America. Two species have been described.

== Taxonomy and evolution ==
The genus Bretzia was named in 1974 by paleontologist Eric Paul Gustafson and his colleague Willis Fry. It was named after geologist J. Harlan Bretz. Bretzia pseudalces is notable for being one of the first deer to live in North America, and one of the earliest ancestors to all New World deer. Fossils of sister species Bretzia nebrascensis has been found in Nebraska and South Dakota. This species survived until the very end of the Pleistocene or Early Holocene (around 10,000 BP).
