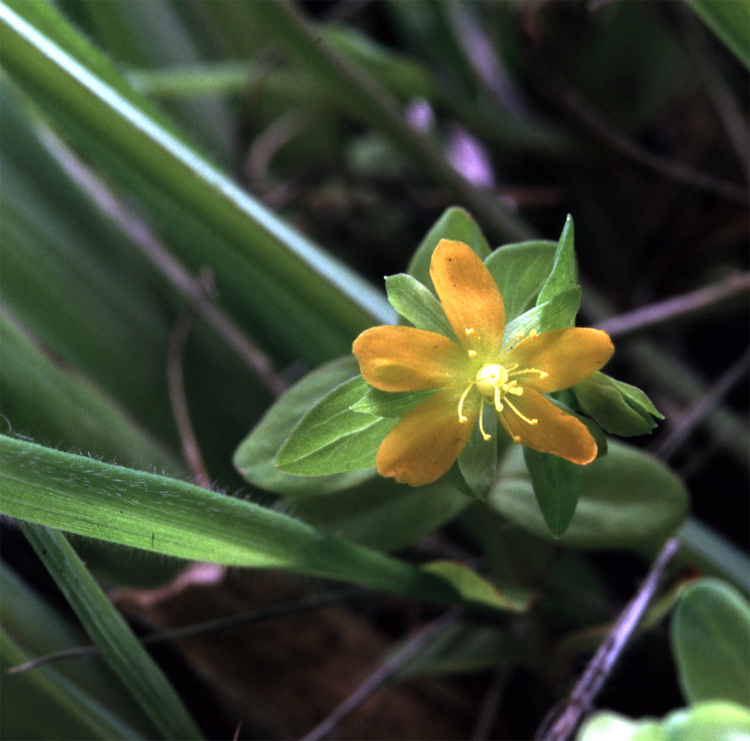

Scientific classification
- Kingdom: Plantae
- Clade: Tracheophytes
- Clade: Angiosperms
- Clade: Eudicots
- Clade: Rosids
- Order: Malpighiales
- Family: Hypericaceae
- Genus: Hypericum
- Section: H. sect. Trigynobrathys
- Species: H. anagalloides

Binomial name
- Hypericum anagalloides Cham. & Schltdl.

= Hypericum anagalloides =

Species of flowering plant in the St John's wort family

Hypericum anagalloides is a species of flowering plant in the St. John's wort family Hypericaceae. It is known by the common names creeping St. John's-wort, tinker's penny and bog St. John's-wort.

It is native to western North America from British Columbia to California and Nevada, where it grows in wet areas such as mountain meadows and streambanks. This is a stoloniferous annual or perennial herb forming lush green patches on the ground. The stems lie across the ground or rise erect somewhat at the ends and grow to about 25 centimeters in maximum length; they are often much shorter and form a carpetlike mat. Each round or oval gland-dotted green leaf is 4 to 15 millimeters long. The flowers grow singly or clustered together. Each has five oval-shaped petals which are usually golden yellow, and up to 25 yellow- or white-anthered stamens.
