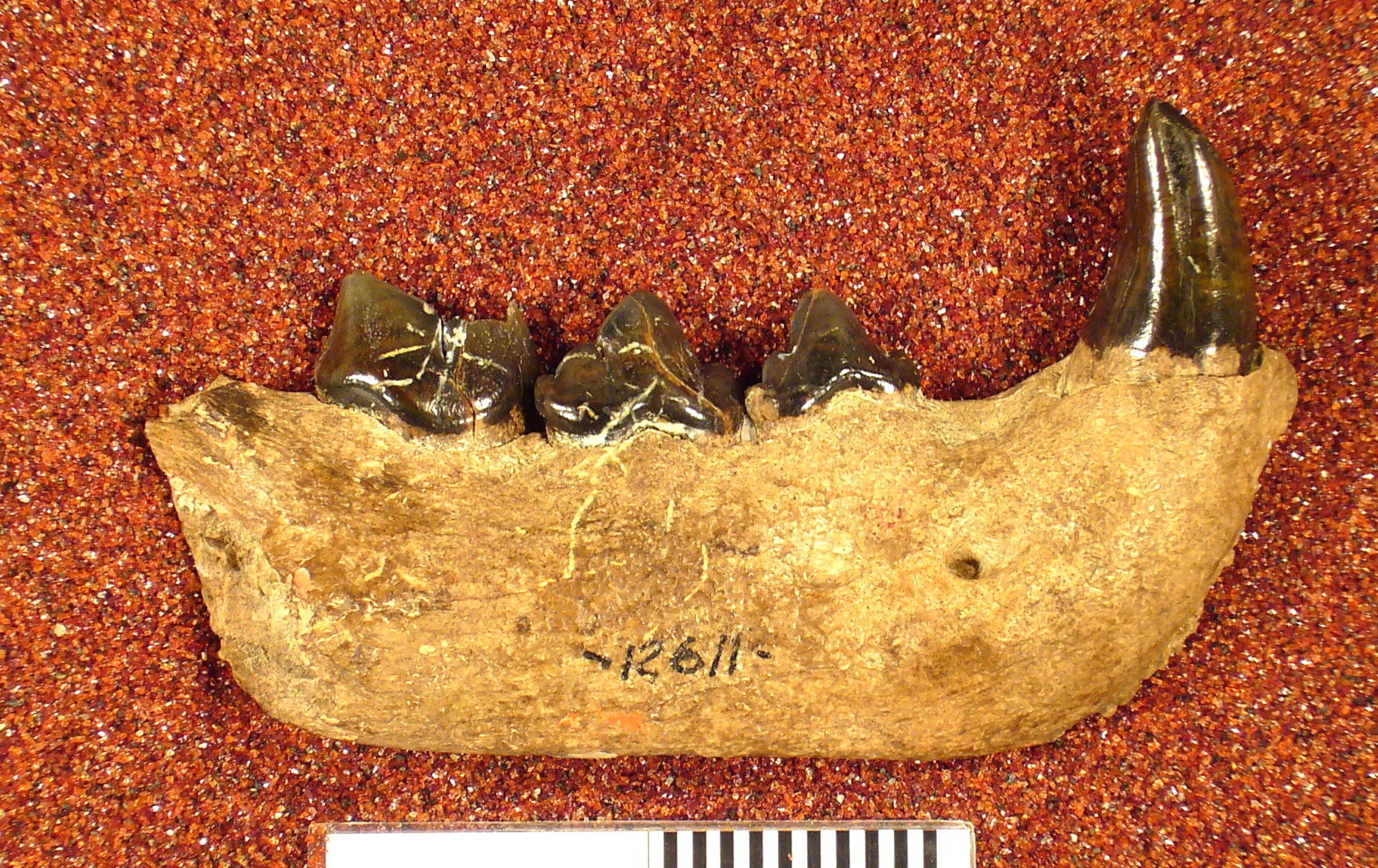
- Holotype at the National Museum of Natural History

Scientific classification
- Kingdom: Animalia
- Phylum: Chordata
- Class: Mammalia
- Order: Carnivora
- Family: Felidae
- Subfamily: Felinae
- Genus: Puma
- Species: †P. lacustris

Binomial name
- †Puma lacustris (Gazin, 1933)

Synonyms
- Felis lacustris Gazin, 1933; Lynx lacustris (Gazin, 1933)

= Puma lacustris =

Lake cat Temporal range: Pliocene (4.18–3.11 MA)–Early Pleistocene

Extinct species of felid

The lake cat (Puma lacustris) is an extinct species of Puma from the Blancan stage (from the Late Pliocene to Early Pleistocene). The type specimen is a partial fragment piece of the right side of the mandible retaining canine and cheek-teeth found in the Hagerman Fossil Beds National Monument from Idaho. The holotype was described in 1933 by Gazin who considered a smaller relative of the cougar. The taxonomic identity has been uncertain at times, as a relationship (and classification) to lynxes has been purposed. Additional specimens of this species of Puma have been found elsewhere in North America, such as Washington, California, Arizona, Texas, and Baja California.

== Taxonomy ==
The earliest lake cat fossils date to 4.18–3.11 MYA and are found in the Blancan Glenns Ferry Formation, Idaho.

== Description ==
Lake cats were medium-sized felines with a size intermediate between modern bobcats and cougars. Remains of lake cats are extremely similar to those of the lynx-like Felis rexroadensis, though fossils of that species are smaller in comparison with the lake cat.
