= Path of the Puma =

Non-fiction book by Jim Williams

- Author: Jim Williams
- Language: English
- Genre: Non-fiction
- Published: 2018
- Publisher: Patagonia Books
- Publication place: U.S.A.
- ISBN: 978-1-938340-72-7

Path of the Puma: The Remarkable Resilience of the Mountain Lion, by Jim Williams, is a non-fiction book presenting the research of the author, a wildlife biologist and supervisor for Montana Fish, Wildlife and Parks' Region 1 in Kalispell. Williams also discusses DNA research conducted by others on these animals, and makes the case for coexistence with these big, wild cats.

== Synopsis ==
With a foreword by Doug Chadwick, the book chronicles Williams' journey, from his early work at a Florida marine park, to his conversion to "a lifelong devotee of the species". Williams has fitted Puma concolors (also known as cougars and mountain lions) with radio collars and has installed cameras in their caves to track and study them. According to Mountain West News, "Montana-based wildlife biologist Jim Williams celebrates wildlife research and conservation of ghost cats from Canada's Yukon Territory to Tierra del Fuego in Argentina and Chile..."

== Critical reception ==
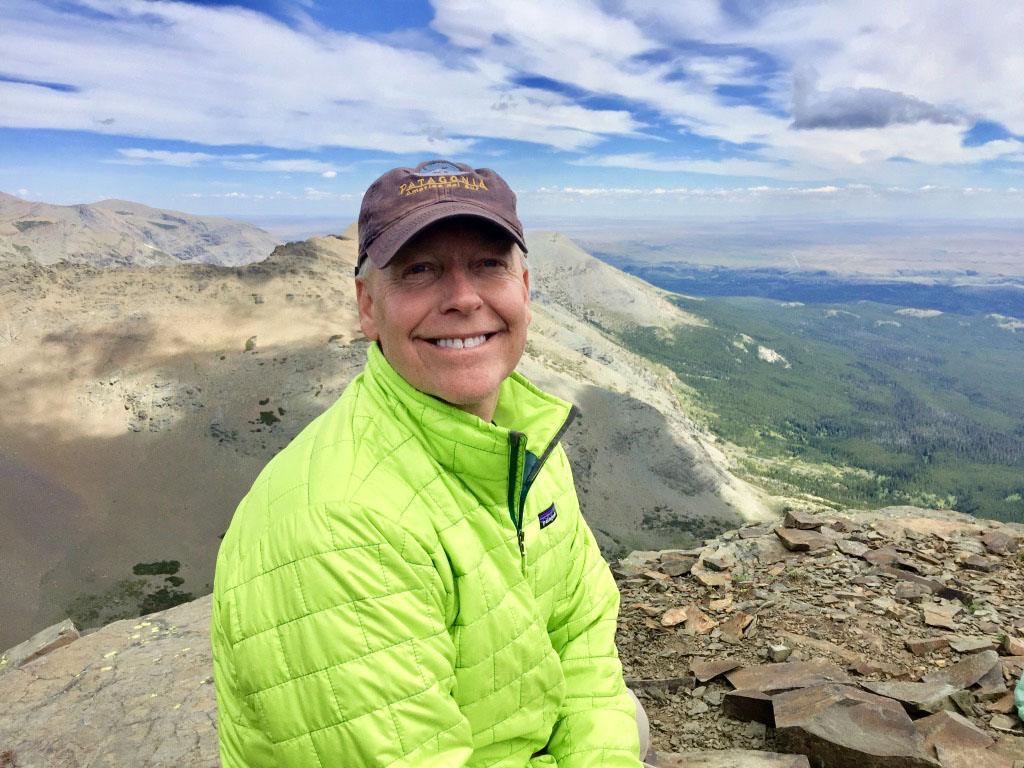
Author Jim Williams

Path of the Puma has received positive reviews. Publishers Weekly said, "Williams writes movingly of the challenges these animals face, many due to human encroachment on their habitats. He makes a strong case for the necessity of preserving—or at least peacefully coexisting with—the puma." Kirkus Reviews noted, "While the book is an undisguised conservationist's plea ... it is not a harangue. The author's passion and his firsthand knowledge of his subject make the narrative highly readable. A noteworthy feature of this work is the presence of numerous full-color photographs..." Kirkus concluded, "A handsome book that is well-balanced, instructive, and authoritative." The Natural History Book Service wrote that the puma's story, "...is fascinating for the lessons it can afford the protection of all species in times of dire challenge and decline."

Susan Waggoner of PressReader notes Williams' "...enthusiasm for nature and animals jumps off every page... Williams's writing is expert, friendly, and interesting. Well organized and clearly presented, information emerges from field work examples, such as the tracking studies that showed that pumas feed almost exclusively on wild prey rather than domestic herds." Tristan Scott of the Flathead Beacon wrote, "Path of the Puma doesn't sugarcoat the risks of predators living among humans — mountain lions live at the intersection of human landscapes, livelihoods and lifestyles — but it points out the critical role predatory species play in the natural world."

== Awards ==
In March 2019, Path of the Puma was named a finalist in two categories for the Foreword INDIES Book of the Year Awards. In June, it was declared the INDIES 2018 Gold winner for Nature in the Adult Non-Fiction category, a category described as "Books that examine not only nature and its inhabitants, but people's connection with nature. Authors present their personal responses to the outdoors, comment on environmental issues, and demonstrate how each person can enjoy and relate to nature." Path of the Puma also won the INDIES 2018 Bronze award for Ecology and Environment in Adult Non-fiction. That award is described, "Books that comment on environmental themes, particularly as applied to the relationships between man, society, and the environment. Often, environmental literature is understood to promote care and concern for the environment and advocates a more thoughtful and ecologically sensitive relationship of man with nature."
