= Acinonyx pleistocaenicus =

Acinonyx pleistocaenicus Temporal range: Early Pleistocene (Calabrian) to Middle Pleistocene ~1.3–0.6 Ma

Scientific classification
- Kingdom: Animalia
- Phylum: Chordata
- Class: Mammalia
- Infraclass: Placentalia
- Order: Carnivora
- Family: Felidae
- Genus: Acinonyx
- Species: †A. pleistocaenicus

Binomial name
- †Acinonyx pleistocaenicus (Zdansky, 1925)

Synonyms
- Cynailurus pleistocaenicus Zdansky, 1925; Acinonyx pardinensis pleistocaenicus (Zdansky, 1925)

Extinct species of mammal

Acinonyx pleistocaenicus is an extinct felid species belonging to the genus Acinonyx, native to Eurasia from the Early Pleistocene to Middle Pleistocene, from 1.3 to 0.6 million years ago. This species was larger than Acinonyx pardinensis.

== Taxonomy ==
=== Classification ===
Originally described as Cynailurus pleistocaenicus, several studies have since considered Acinonyx pleistocaenicus as a subspecies of Acinonyx pardinensis. However, Jiangzuo et al. (2024) suggested that its cranial and dental anatomy have more distinguishing features and resemble modern cheetahs based on new specimens, classifying A. pleistocaenicus and A. pardinensis as separate species.

=== Evolution ===
Acinonyx pleistocaenicus may have evolved from A. pardinensis in Eurasia during the Early Pleistocene. During the Middle Pleistocene, A. pleistocaenicus was replaced by Acinonyx intermedius. In spite of its similarity to A. intermedius and modern cheetah, A. pleistocaenicus is probably not a direct ancestor to either species.

== Description ==
Acinonyx pleistocaenicus was the largest known species within the Acinonyx genus. Within Untermassfeld, males and females weighing 130 kg (290 lb) and 110 kg (240 lb) respectively, based on postcranial bones. Individuals within Zhoukoudian were even larger and were the largest members of the species, with males and females respectively weighing 188 kg (414 lb) and 178 kg (392 lb). Considering the specimens found in Zhoukoudian were youngest record for the species, this may suggest A. pleistocaenicus increased in size over time, at least during the early Middle Pleistocene in East Asia. Despite its larger size, postcranial bones suggests its body was similar to modern cheetahs.

== Paleobiology and Paleoecology ==
Within the upper deposits of Jinyuan Cave, Acinonyx pleistocaenius coexisted with predators such as Xenocyon lycaonoides, Ursus, Pachycrocuta brevirostris sinensis, Megantereon, and Panthera gombaszogensis jinpuensis. In Zhoukoudian, carnivorans present were Ursus arctos, Pachycrocuta brevirostris sinensis, Homotherium latidens, and tigers. It was one of the largest carnivores within its fauna and unlike modern cheetahs, would’ve been able to defend their kills due to its large body size and robust canines. Ideal prey for this species would’ve weighed 100–300 kg (220–660 lb), such as Cervus, Sinomegaceros, and Equus. The ectotympanic chamber wasn’t enlarge as modern cheetahs, suggesting it wasn’t as adapted for open environments.
