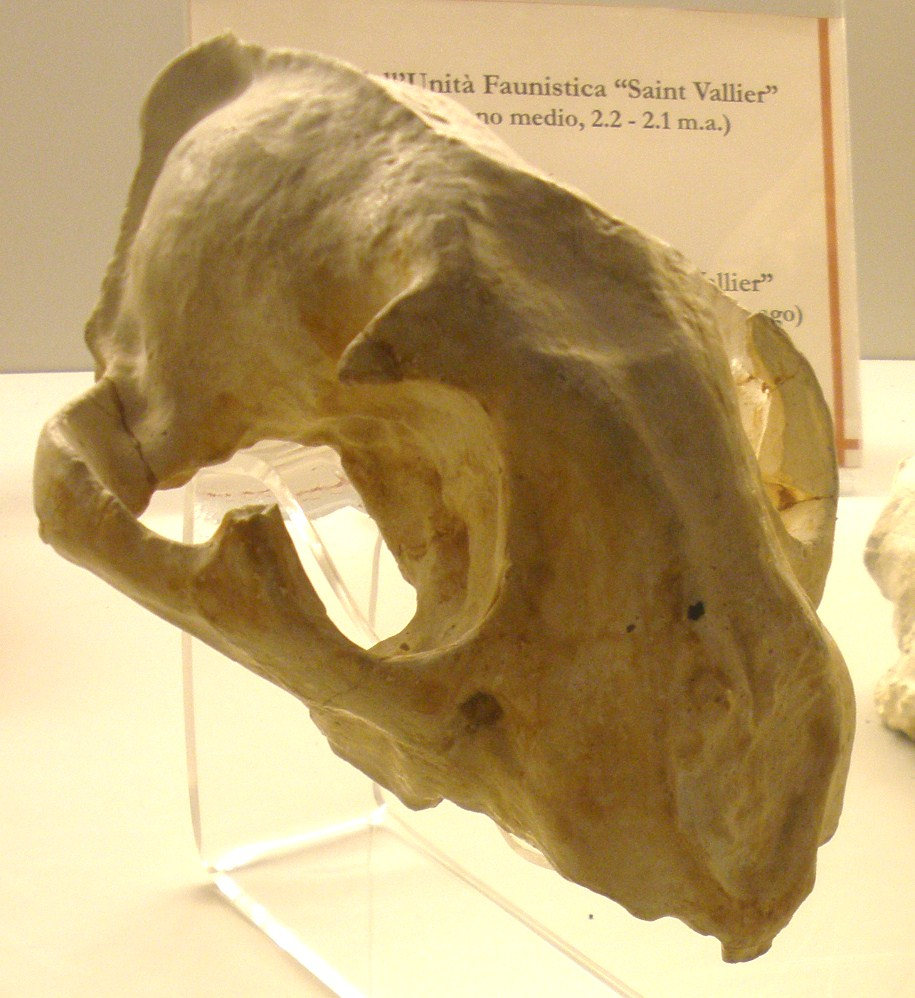
- Skull
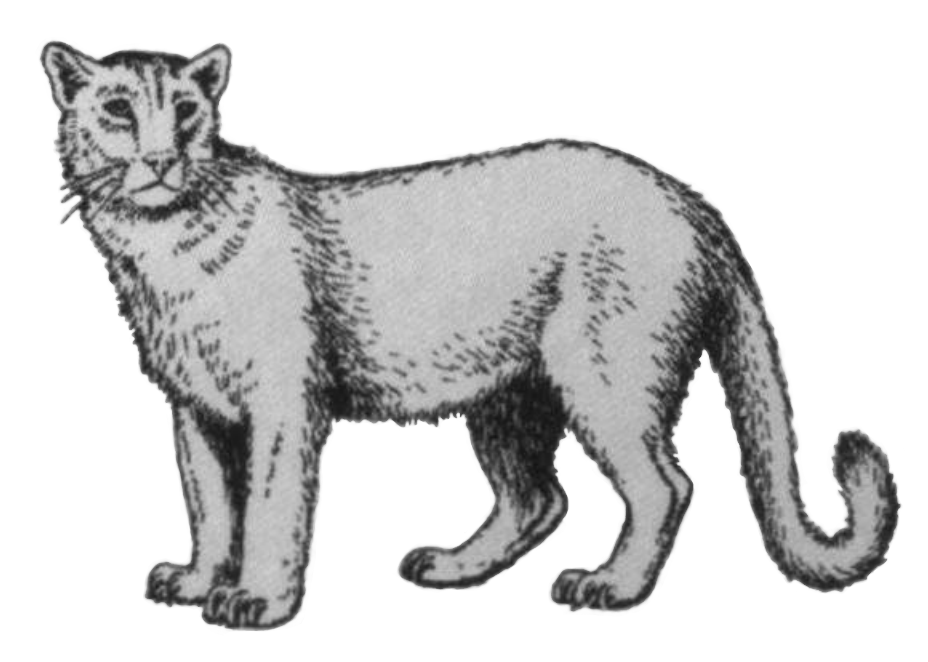
- Life reconstruction

Scientific classification
- Kingdom: Animalia
- Phylum: Chordata
- Class: Mammalia
- Order: Carnivora
- Family: Felidae
- Genus: Puma
- Species: †P. pardoides

Binomial name
- †Puma pardoides (Owen, 1846)

Synonyms
- Felis pardoides Owen, 1846; Panthera schaubi Viret, 1954; Viretailurus schaubi (Viret, 1954) sensu Hemmer, 1964

= Puma pardoides =

Puma pardoides Temporal range: Late Pliocene - Early Pleistocene (Piacenzian-Calabrian) 3–0.86 Ma

Extinct species of felid

Puma pardoides is an extinct prehistoric cat belonging to the genus Puma known from fossils found in Europe and West Asia during the late Pliocene and Early Pleistocene epochs, spanning from around 3 million to 860,000 years ago.

== Research history and taxonomy ==
Puma pardoides was originally described in 1846 by Richard Owen as Felis pardoides. A complete skull, described in 1954 as Panthera schaubi, was reassigned in 1965 to a new genus as Viretailurus schaubi due to distinct differences from other pantherine cats. However, in 2001, it was proposed that various puma-like fossils found in Eurasia could all be attributed to a single species: Puma pardoides. In 2004, Viretailurus schaubia was also determined to be a junior synonym of Puma pardoides.

Panthera schaubi or Viretailurus schaubi was historically often regarded as a basal member of the genus Panthera. However, research in 2004 concluded that Viretailurus should actually be included in the genus Puma as a junior synonym of Puma pardoides. Some authors have continued to consider Viretailurus the correct genus for this species. However, their classification was difficult, due to the similarities between leopards and pumas, until teeth found at the Upper Pliocene Transcaucasian site of Kvabebi were found to be similar to those of pumas. It is generally considered that Puma pardoides is closely related to the living cougar (Puma concolor, also known as the puma or mountain lion), which has lent support to the idea of a Eurasian origin of the cougar lineage.

== Description ==
Hemmer (2004) estimated that Puma pardoides weighed between 35–100 kg (77–220 lb), comparable but more similar to large individuals of the living cougar. The cranial and postcranial bones of P. pardoides were more robust than those of the living cougar.

== Distribution and chronology ==
P. pardoides is known from fossils unearthed in Britain (Red Crag), France, Germany, Romania, Spain, Italy, Greece, and Georgia The oldest fossils are known from the Late Pliocene, around 3.07 million years ago, while the youngest specimen dates to near end of the Early Pleistocene, around 860,000 years ago.

== Paleobiology ==
Much like cougars, Puma pardoides was probably a solitary ambush hunter with an estimated preferred prey mass of around 45–180 kg (99–397 lb), with smaller and larger prey of 10–45 kg (22–99 lb) and 180–360 kg (400–790 lb) respectively probably being taken less often. Evidence from the late Early Pleistocene site of Untermassfeld in Germany suggests that at this locality P. pardoides extensively preyed on deer (Cervidae). Suggested prey species include the extinct roe deer Capreolus cusanoides, and the fallow deer-sized species Cervus nestii. At Untermassfeld it is also suggested to have hunted wild boar (Sus scrofa).

== Paleoecology ==
In the earliest Pleistocene (2.6-2 million years ago) of Europe, Puma pardoides lived alongside the hyenas Pliocrocuta and Chasmaporthetes, the sabertooth cats Megantereon and Homotherium, the giant cheetah Acinonyx pardinensis , the primitive lynx Lynx issiodorensis, the bear Ursus etruscus, the early wolf ancestor Canis etruscus, and the wild dog Xenocyon. In the late Early Pleistocene (~2-1 million years ago), Chasmaporthetes and Pliocrocuta became extinct, with this time period seeing the arrival of the giant hyena Pachycrocuta and the "European jaguar" Panthera gombaszogensis.

== Extinction ==
The last known occurrences of Puma pardoides are from about 0.85 Ma. The extinction of this felid (which also coincided with the extinction of other carnviores, including Pachycrocuta, Megantereon, and Xenocyon) may have been result of significant climatic change in Europe as part of the Mid-Pleistocene Transition. Following the extinction of P. pardoides, its ecological niche was taken over by the European leopard (Panthera pardus), which arrived in Europe around the beginning of the Middle Pleistocene.
