= Acinonyx kurteni =

Discredited fossil specimen

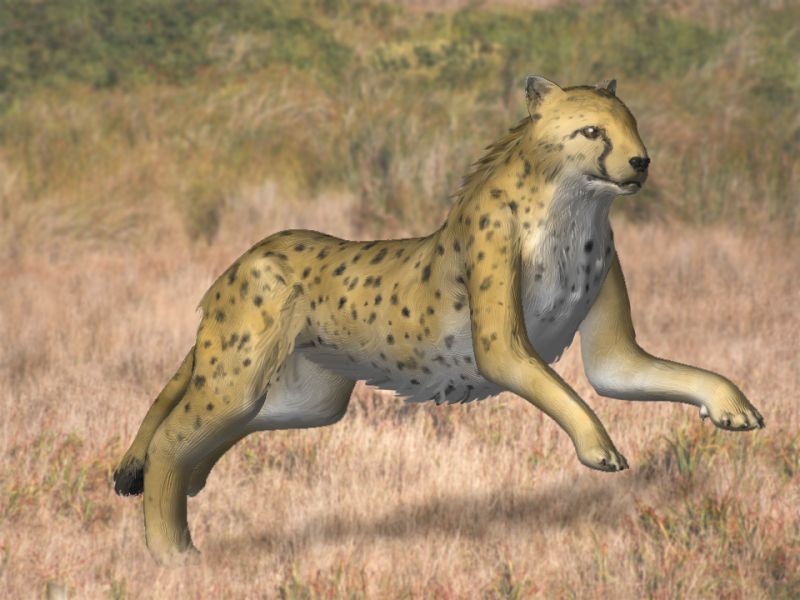
Reconstruction of "Acinonyx kurteni"

"Acinonyx kurteni", or the Linxia cheetah, is a discredited fossil specimen of an extinct cheetah discovered in China. The scientific name was assigned for the skull that was originally described to be that of an extinct species of cheetah, endemic to Asia during the Late Pliocene sub-epoch. It was estimated to have lived around 2.2 to 2.5 Ma BP, existing for approximately 0.3 million years.

The fossil discovery was reported in 2008, and was claimed to be the most primitive Acinonyx lineage so far discovered. Further, the study concluded that the cheetahs originated in the Old World, not the New World as previously believed. It was thought to share some features with the modern cheetah, Acinonyx jubatus, such as in having enlarged sinuses for air intake during sprinting, while its teeth show primitive features.

After a long suspicion of the authenticity of the fossil, it was finally accepted as a forgery in 2012.

== Discovery and description ==
The fossil skull was discovered in 2008 and described in 2009 by Per Christiansen, from the Zoological Museum in Copenhagen, and Ji H. Mazák, of the Shanghai Science and Technology Museum, in the journal Proceedings of the National Academy of Sciences, USA. It was reported as being discovered from the Late Pliocene, fossiliferous-rich “Hezheng” locality in Linxia basin (hence the popular name "Linxia cheetah"), in the south-eastern part of Gansu Province, China. The species name was given in honour of Björn Kurtén, the late professor of paleontology at the University of Helsinki. The skull was almost complete except for the occipital condyles, basioccipital region and upper canines. It resembles the true cheetahs in having a tall skull with a domed structure, a very wide braincase relative to skull length, enlarged frontal sinuses, a large nasal aperture, and a well-developed occipital crest. But the upper premolars are very primitive, like those of some extinct felines. It is older than earlier described species, such as the European Acinonyx pardinensis (dated to about 2.2 Ma old) and the North African Acinonyx aicha (about 2.5 Ma old). Thus, it apparently disproved the prevailing notion that cheetahs originated in the New World.

== Discrediting ==
Even at the time of pre-publication of the research paper in 2008, there were already strong doubts about the veracity of the fossil. Tao Deng, Professor of Paleontology at the Institute for Vertebrate Paleontology and Paleoanthropology in China, upon proofreading the manuscript, noted the possible forgery of the fossil, and immediately reported this to PNAS. Just from the published pictures, Deng said that he could see that parts of the skull had been concocted from plaster. The technical give-away was that the parietal area appeared glued together from disparate bone pieces, to imitate the skull of a modern cheetah. He noted that parts of the skull were created from plaster, and are missing part of the parietal crests. However, his objection to publication was denied in an editorial letter on 5 February 2009, on the grounds that Deng had not personally examined the fossil.

Qiu Zhanxiang, a global expert in mammalian craniums, also supported the claim that the skull was forged. Since then it has been criticised publicly by a number of paleontologists in China. However, Mazák denied anyone else access to the fossil, and upon inquiry, the senior author, Christiansen, had never seen the original specimen.

By 2010, there was increasing suspicion in the scientific community that the fossil was fake, including a number of others from China. The two discoverers responded with a published defense of their fossil. In 2012, Deng was finally allowed access to the original fossil upon invoking the PNAS data access policy, and on examination, his primary observations were proven correct. He concluded that the fossil has been collected from the Late Miocene (several million years older than estimated in the original publication) red clay in Guanghe County, and not from the reported region in Dongxiang County. In addition, the zygomatic arches of the skull were made from ribs, the incisors were actually premolars from other carnivores, and the posterior part of the skull was simply a crude plaster.

Deng asked Mazák to retract the paper. Mazák finally conceded by stating (on 20 August 2012 in PNAS) that: “after further examination, it was determined that the fossil used in the study was a composite specimen from the late Miocene laterite and not from the early Pleistocene loess. The article is hereby retracted.”
