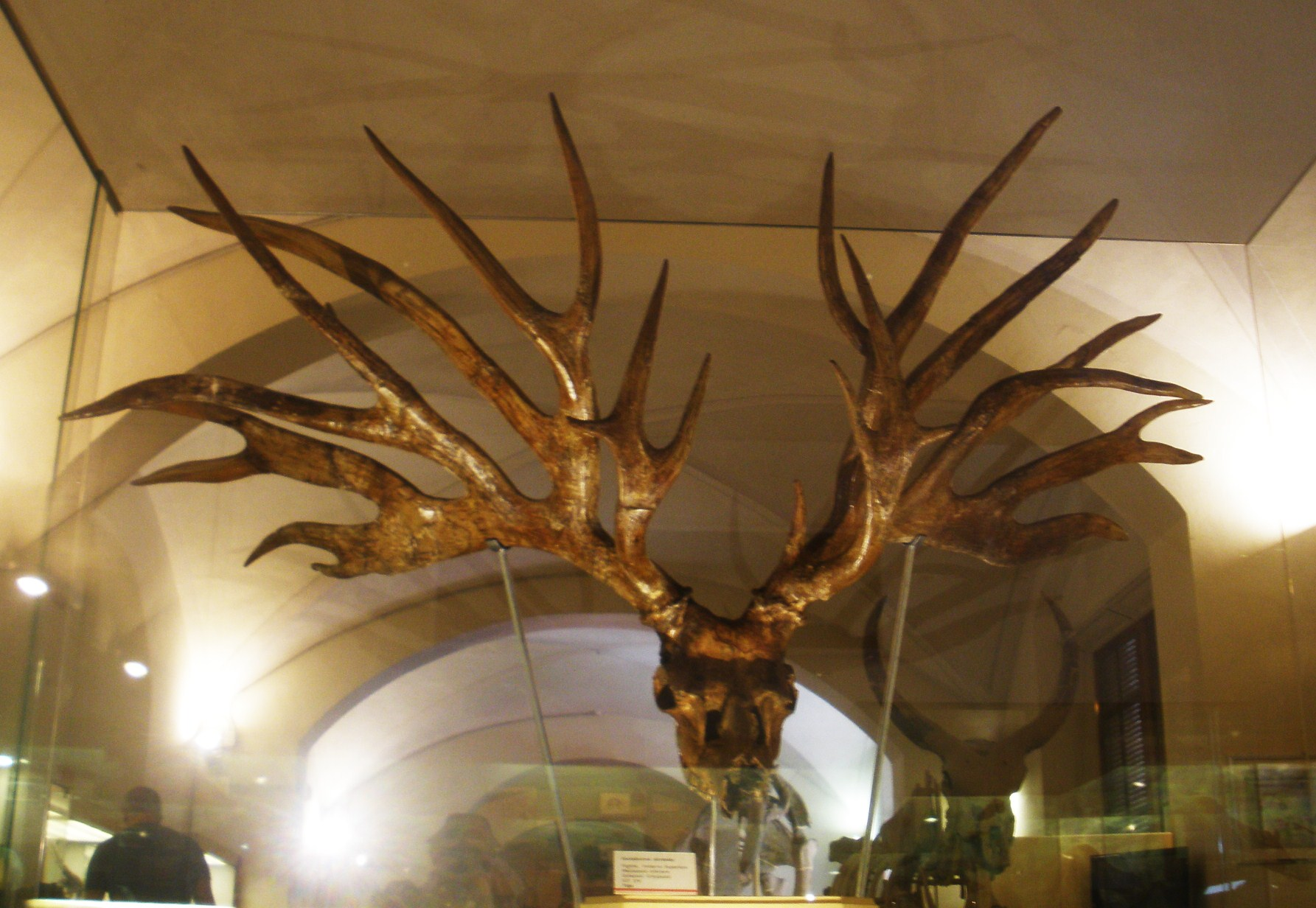
- Skull of Eucladoceros dicranios

Scientific classification
- Kingdom: Animalia
- Phylum: Chordata
- Class: Mammalia
- Order: Artiodactyla
- Family: Cervidae
- Subfamily: Cervinae
- Genus: †Eucladoceros; Falconer, 1868

Type species
- †Eucladoceros dicranios (Nesti, 1841)

Other species
- †E. boulei Boule, 1928; †E. dichotomus; †E. senezensis Depéret, 1910; †E. ctenoides Nesti, 1841; †E. tetraceros Dawkins, 1878; †E. proboulei Dong et Ye, 1996; †E giulii Kahlke, 1997; †E. montenegrensis Van der Made and Dimitrijević, 2015

Synonyms
- Polycladus Pomel, 1854

= Eucladoceros =

Eucladoceros Temporal range: Early Pliocene to Early Pleistocene

Extinct genus of mammal

Eucladoceros (Greek for "well-branched antler") is an extinct genus of large deer whose fossils have been discovered across Eurasia, from Europe to China, spanning from the Early Pliocene to the end of the Early Pleistocene. The various species of the genus are noted for their unusual comb-like or branching antlers, though antler shape varied considerably between different species.

== Description ==
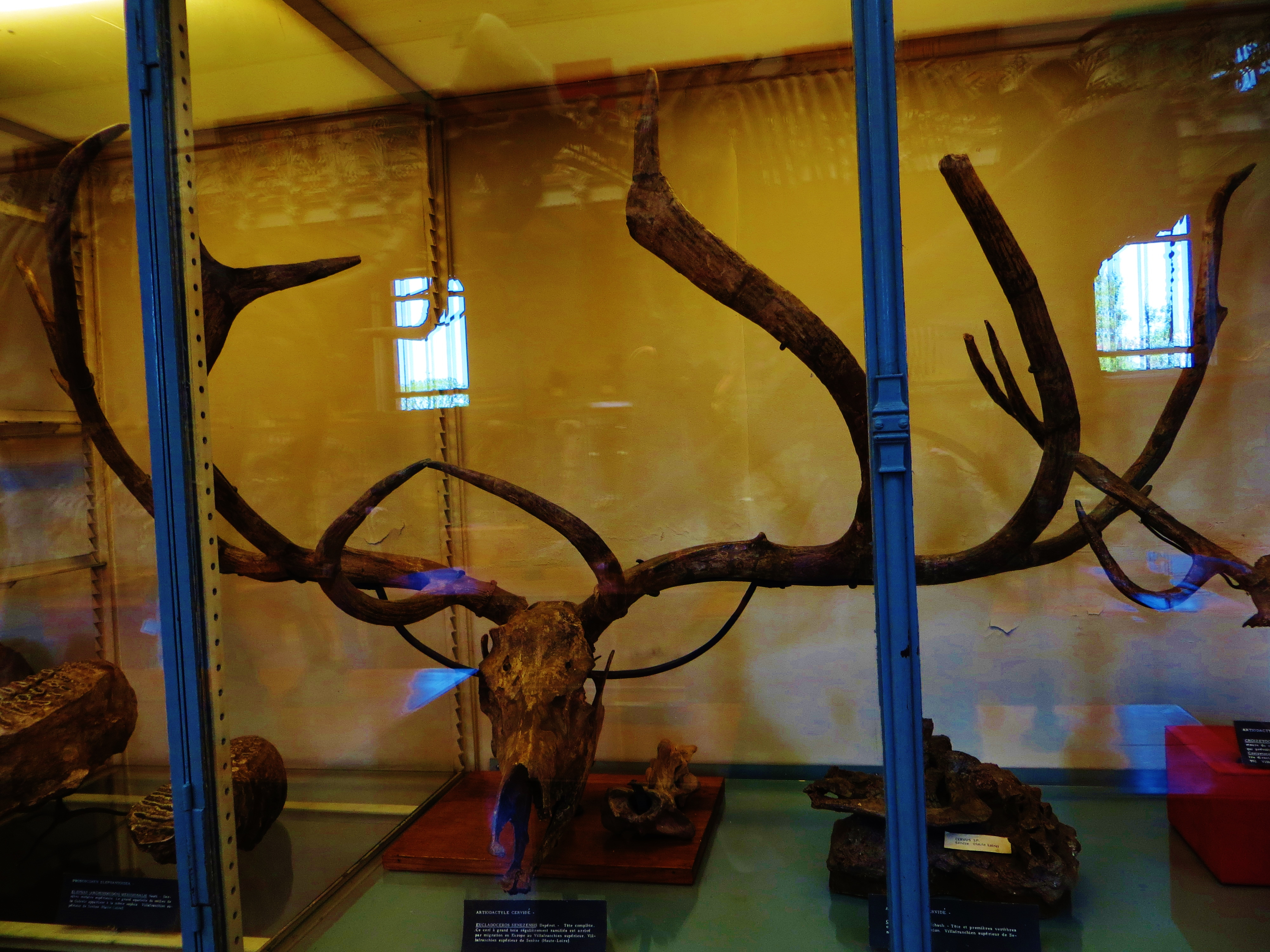
Skull of Eucladoceros ctenoides (labelled under the synonymous name E. senezensis)

Species of Eucladoceros were large-sized deer. The European species E. dicranios and E. ctenoides are suggested to have had a body mass of 300 and 250 kilograms (660 and 550 lb), respectively ^{supplementary material} while East Asian E. boulei is suggested to have reached body masses of 350 kilograms (770 lb). Body size of European species increased over time. E. giulii has been estimated to have had a body mass of 385 kilograms (849 lb) and a shoulder height of 1.55 metres (5.1 ft) while E. senezensis has an estimated shoulder height of 1.7 metres (5.6 ft). Species of Eucladoceros are noted for their branching antlers, with a large number of tines projecting from the front part of the main antler beam. In many species like Eucladoceros ctenoides the antlers have a comb-like branching pattern, while those of the type species Eucladoceros dicranios has a more complex dichotomous branching pattern. The antlers of E. dicranios are proportionally large relative to body size, and are among the largest antlers known among deer. The teeth of Eucladoceros species are similar in some aspects to those of the genus Cervus, but lack certain derived characters typical of the teeth of that genus. The shape of the lesser trochanter near the top of the femur is considered an important character to distinguish Eucladoceros from Praemegaceros.

== Taxonomy and distribution ==
Eucladoceros was first created as a subgenus of Cervus (the genus that contains red deer, elk/wapiti, and sika deer, among others) in a posthumous publication by British palaeontologist Hugh Falconer in 1868, to contain the species Cervus (Eucladoceros) sedgwickii, described from remains found in Bacton, Norfolk, England. It was later realised that this species is a junior synonym of Eucladoceros dicranios, named in 1841 by Florentine naturalist Filippo Nesti, director of the Museum of Natural History of Florence, based on remains from the Upper Valdarno region of Tuscany in northern Italy. The oldest species of the genus is E. proboulei from the Early Pliocene (c. 5 Ma) of Shanxi, northern China, with the genus subsequently dispersing into Europe during the Late Pliocene, at least as early as 3.2-3 million years ago. The last species of the genus went extinct at the end of the Early Pleistocene.

The systematics of the genus is somewhat confused. Two species are generally recognised in northern China, E. proboulei and E. boulei and three generally recognised species in Europe, E. ctenoides (which has several recognised synonyms that are sometimes treated as subspecies, including E. senezensis, E. darestei, E. falconeri, E. tegulensis, and possibly E. tetraceros) E. dicranios, and E. tetraceros, with E. giulii and E. montenegrensis are also assigned to the genus by some authors. Some poor remains with affinities to Eucladoceros are found also in Tajikistan and the Pinjor Formation of the Indian subcontinent.

Eucladoceros is widely agreed to a be member of the tribe Cervini, though its placement within this group has been debated. A 2017 study analysing the bony labyrinth suggested that Eucladoceros was most closely related to the living genera Rusa (sambar) and Cervus. Some authors have proposed a close relationship to the extinct "giant deer" genus Praemegaceros.

=== Species ===
- Eucladoceros boulei Boule (1928), Age: Latest Pliocene - Early Pleistocene; Nihowan, China
- Eucladoceros ctenoides (former name E. teguliensis) F. Nesti (1841), Age: Early Pleistocene, Late Villafranchian; Locus typicus: Upper Valdarno, Tuscany, Italy
- Eucladoceros dichotomus (Original citation: Cervus (Elaphurus) dichotomus Teilhard de Chardin & Piveteau; Early Pleistocene of Nohowan; most probably is not a Eucladoceros species)
- Eucladoceros dicranios Nesti (1841), Age: Early Pleistocene, Late Villafranchian; Upper Valdarno, Tuscany, Italy. Note: the type species of the genus.
- Eucladoceros proboulei Dong et Ye, 1996, Age: Early Pliocene; China
- Eucladoceros senezensis Depéret, 1910, Senèze (Haute-Loire), near Brioude, France. Note: some authors regard it as a subspecies of E. ctenoides.
- Eucladoceros tetraceros Boyd Dawkins (1878), Age: Early Pleistocene; Peyrolles, Haute-Loire, France. Note: a possible synonym of E. ctenoides.
- Eucladoceros giulii Kahlke, 1997, late Early Pleistocene, Untermassfeld, Germany (c 1.1 Ma), Venta Micena, Spain (c. 1.3 Ma). Also alternatively assigned to the genus Arvernoceros. and Praedama.
- Eucladoceros montenegrensis Van der Made and Dimitrijević, 2015, late Early Pleistocene Trlica, Montenegro (~1.2-0.8 Ma)

== Ecology ==
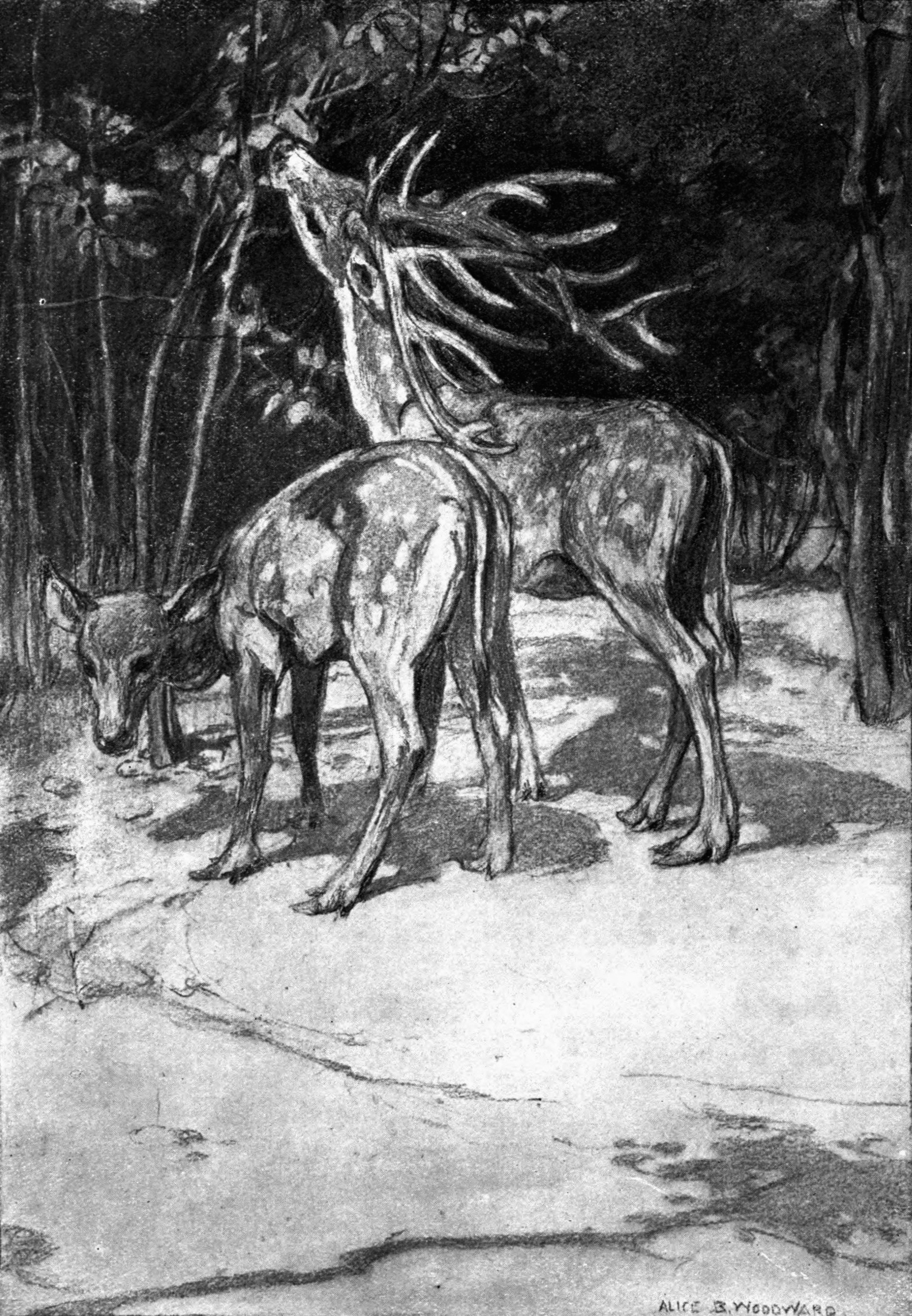
Life restoration of Eucladoceros dicranios

Analysis of the limbs of Eucladoceros suggest that they are most similar to living deer that occupy open habitats. Dental microwear analysis of Eucladoceros ctenoides suggests that its diet was largely plastic and widely varied according to local conditions, and it is suggested to have occupied open habitats. Eucladoceros giulii is suggested to have been a strict browser that lived in closed forests based on isotopic analysis and tooth morphology of specimens from Spain. At the Untermassfeld site in Germany Eucladoceros giulii is suggested to have been preyed upon by the "European jaguar" (Panthera gombaszogensis) and the "giant cheetah" (Acinonyx pardinensis).

== Literature ==
- Azzaroli, A. 1954. "Critical observations upon Siwalik deer". The Proceedings of the Linnean Society of London, 165: 75-83, London.
- Azzaroli, A. & Mazza, P. 1992. "The cervid genus Eucladoceros in the early Pleistocene of Tuscany". Palaeontographia Italica, 79: 43-100; Pisa.
- Croitor R. & Bonifay M.-F. 2001. "Étude préliminaire des cerfs du gisement Pleistocène inférieur de Ceyssaguet (Haute-Loire)". Paleo, 13: 129-144.
- Dong W. & Ye J. 1996. "Two new cervid species from the late Neogene of Yushe Basin, Shanxi Province, China". Vertebrata PalAsiatica, 34 (2): 135-144.
- Heintz E. 1970. "Les Cervides Villafranchiens de France et d’Espagne". Memoires du Museum national d’histoire naturelle. Ser.C, Sc. De la Terre, 22 (1-2): 1-302, Paris.
- Vos, J. De, Mol D. & Reumer J. W. F.1995. "Early pleistocene Cervidae (Mammalia, Artyodactyla) from the Oosterschelde (the Netherlands), with a revision of the cervid genus Eucladoceros Falconer", 1868. Deinsea, 2: 95-121.
