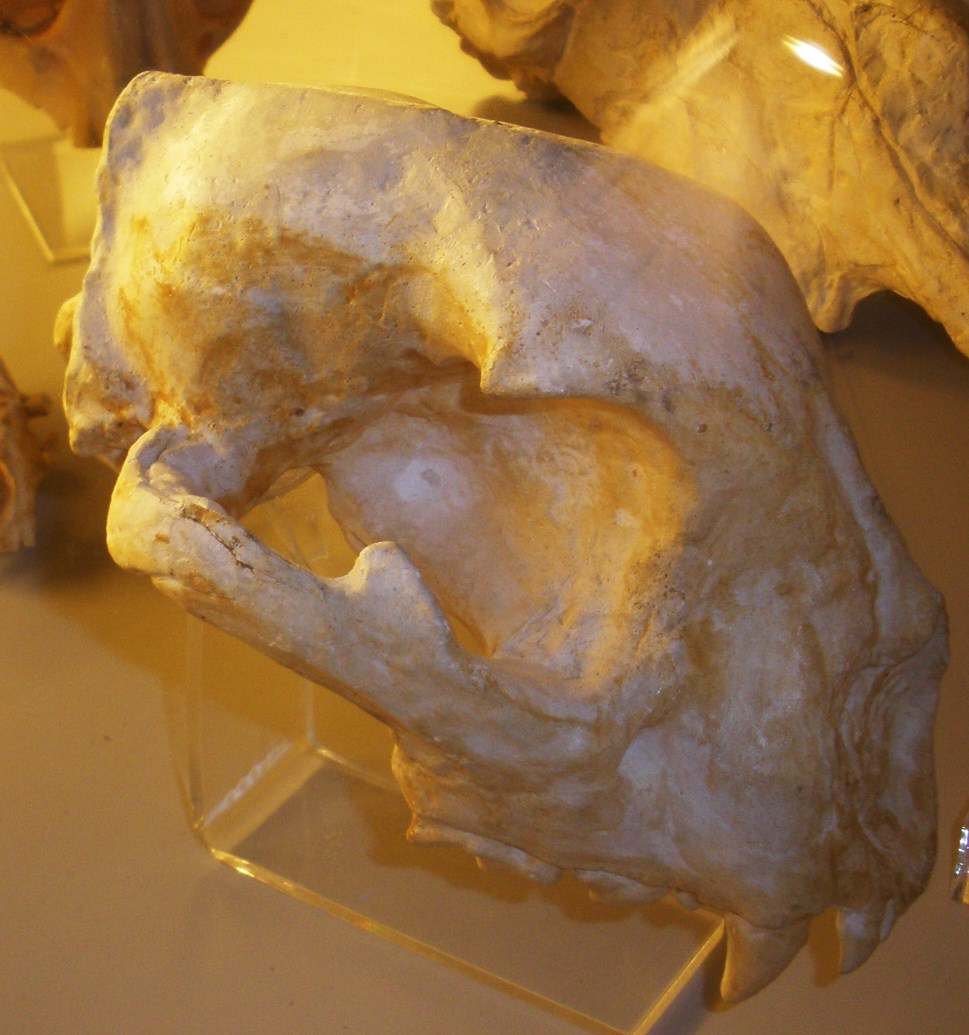
- Skull, Museum of Paleontology in Florence, Italy

Scientific classification
- Kingdom: Animalia
- Phylum: Chordata
- Class: Mammalia
- Order: Carnivora
- Family: Felidae
- Genus: Acinonyx
- Species: †A. pardinensis

Binomial name
- †Acinonyx pardinensis (Croizet & Jobert, 1828)

Synonyms
- Felis pardinensis Croizet & Jobert, 1828; Felis elata Bravard in Gervais, 1859; Cynailurus etruscus Del Camp, 1915; Cynailurus elatus sensu Schaub, 1939; Schaubia vireti Schaub, 1942

= Acinonyx pardinensis =

Acinonyx pardinensis Temporal range: Late Pliocene to Middle Pleistocene (Calabrian) 3–0.5 Ma

Extinct species of carnivore

Acinonyx pardinensis, sometimes called the giant cheetah, is an extinct felid species belonging to the genus Acinonyx, closely related to the cheetah, native to Eurasia from Late Pliocene to the early Middle Pleistocene epoch from around 3 million to around 500,000 years ago. It was substantially larger than the living cheetah.

== Description ==
Acinonyx pardinensis was roughly twice the size of today's cheetahs, weighing around 60–121 kg (132–267 lb), though A. pleistocaenicus was much larger. The morphology of the skull shows some similarities with those of pantherine cats and is not as short and deep as that of the modern cheetah. The teeth greatly resemble that of a modern cheetah. The limb bones, like those of a modern cheetah, were elongate relative to the animal's body size. The lumbar vertebrae were also elongate, suggesting the back was flexible. Compared to living cheetahs, the femur is more straight and the fibula is more robust and not fused to the tibia. The humerus is also more robust. The inner ear of A. pardinensis lacks the living cheetahs specialised adaptions to fast running such as the extensive expansion of vestibular system and elongation of the semicircular canals, and more closely resembles the ancestral felid inner ear morphology.

== Classification ==
Acinonyx pardinensis is sometimes considered a macrospecies containing Acinonyx aicha, Acinonyx arvernensis, Acinonyx intermedius, Acinonyx pleistocaenicus, and Sivapanthera linxiaensis as subspecies.

== Distribution and habitat ==
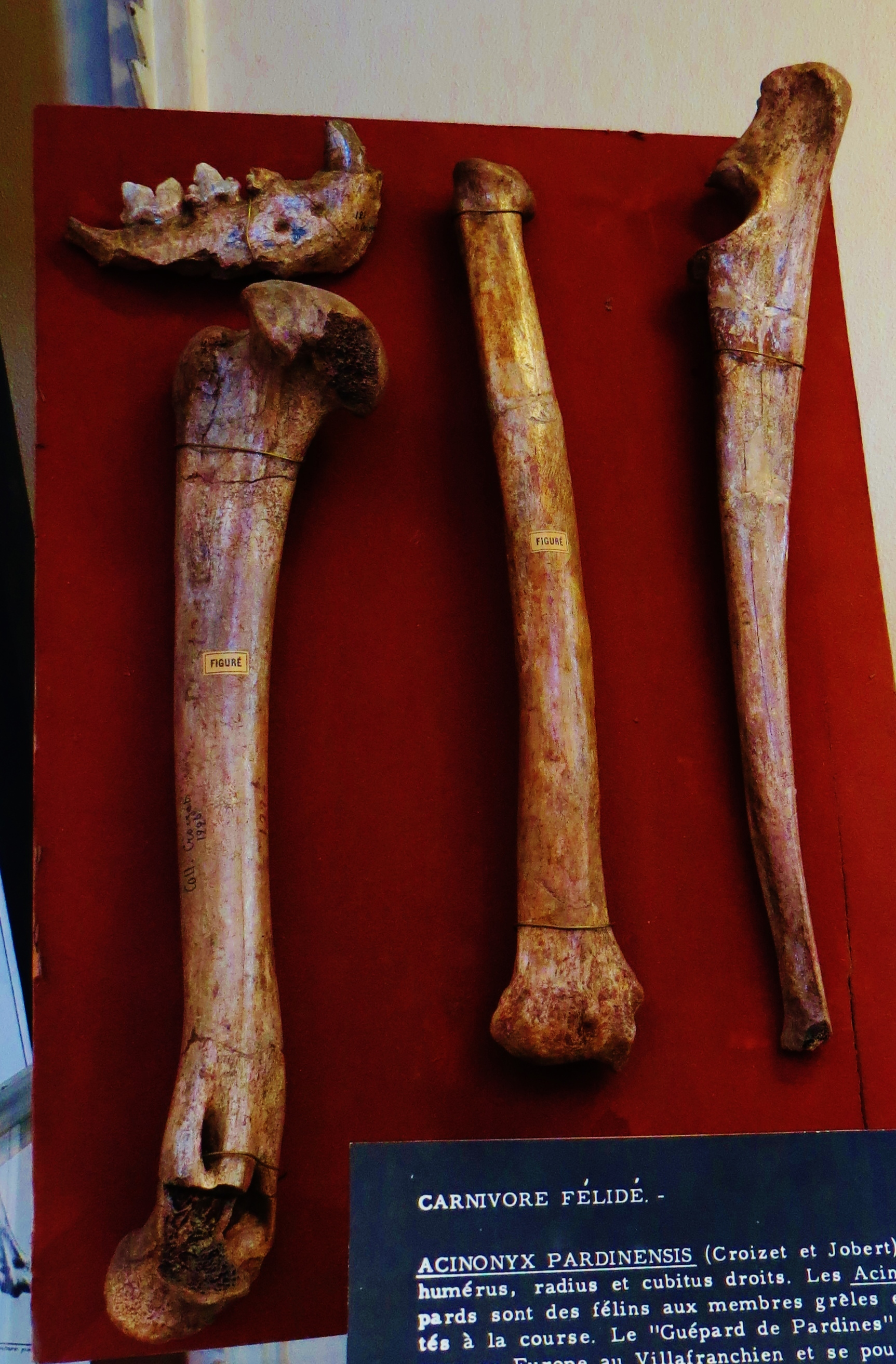
Fossils, Paris

Acinonyx pardinensis is known from remains spanning from western Europe to China, spanning from the Late Pliocene to the Middle Pleistocene. The true number of species of Acinonyx in the Plio-Pleistocene of Eurasia is unclear. The earliest fossils of the species are known from towards the end of the Pliocene, around 3 million years ago from sites such as Villafranca d’Asti in Italy. The youngest record of the species is from Mosbach in Germany, dating to around 500,000 years ago.

== Paleobiology ==
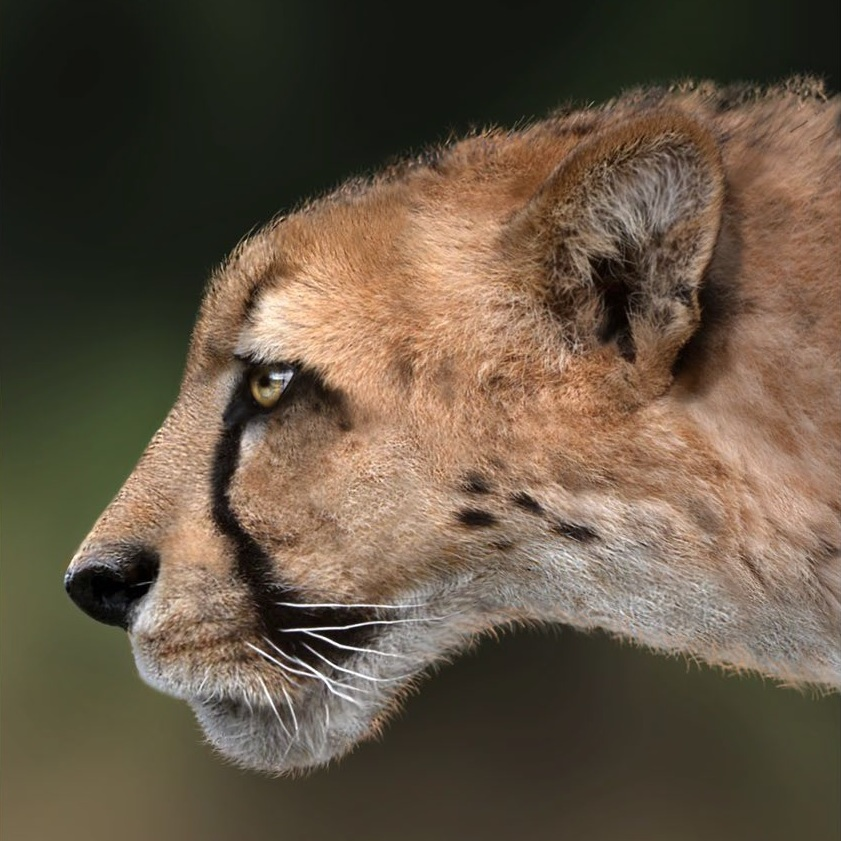
Restoration

Like the modern cheetah, Acinonyx pardinensis is generally thought to have been adapted to running down prey. It probably took larger prey than living cheetahs, with estimated prey masses of 50–100 kilograms (110–220 lb), though the idea that its ecology was similar to a modern cheetah has been contested by some authors, who suggest an ecology more similar to pantherine cats. A 2011 study of the mandible shapes suggested that like the cheetah, it probably took medium-sized prey. Due to its larger body size, it probably did not reach the maximum top speed as modern cheetah, though it still was likely a capable and fast sprinter. The morphology of its carnassial teeth suggest like modern cheetahs that it did not consume bone, and probably left large parts of carcasses to other carnivores. While a 2011 study suggested that it killed its prey by suffocation like a modern cheetah, a 2014 study alternatively suggested that Acinonyx pardinensis likely killed prey via a bite to the neck similar to pantherine cats.

A study of the late Early Pleistocene Untermassfeld site in Germany, dating to around 1 million years ago, suggested that at this locality Acinonyx pardinensis primarily preyed upon calves of the "steonine" equine Equus wuesti and the fallow deer sized deer Cervus nestii, and perhaps took juveniles of other animals, such as bison, the elk/moose ancestor Cervalces carnutorum, the large deer Eucladoceros giulii and the early roe deer Capreolus cusanoides less frequently.

== Paleoecology ==
In the earliest Pleistocene (2.6-2 million years ago) of Europe, Acinonyx pardinensis lived alongside the hyenas Pliocrocuta and Chasmaporthetes, the sabertooth cats Megantereon and Homotherium, the cougar-relative Puma pardoides, the primitive lynx Lynx issiodorensis, the bear Ursus etruscus, the early wolf ancestor Canis etruscus, and the wild dog Xenocyon. In the late Early Pleistocene (~2-1 million years ago), Chasmaporthetes and Pliocrocuta became extinct, with this time period seeing the arrival of the giant hyena Pachycrocuta and the "European jaguar" Panthera gombaszogensis. The end of the Early Pleistocene around 1-0.8 million years ago was marked by the extinction of Puma pardoides, Megantereon and Pachycrocuta, and the arrival of European leopards, cave hyenas, and the large lion Panthera fossilis.

== See also ==
- Miracinonyx
