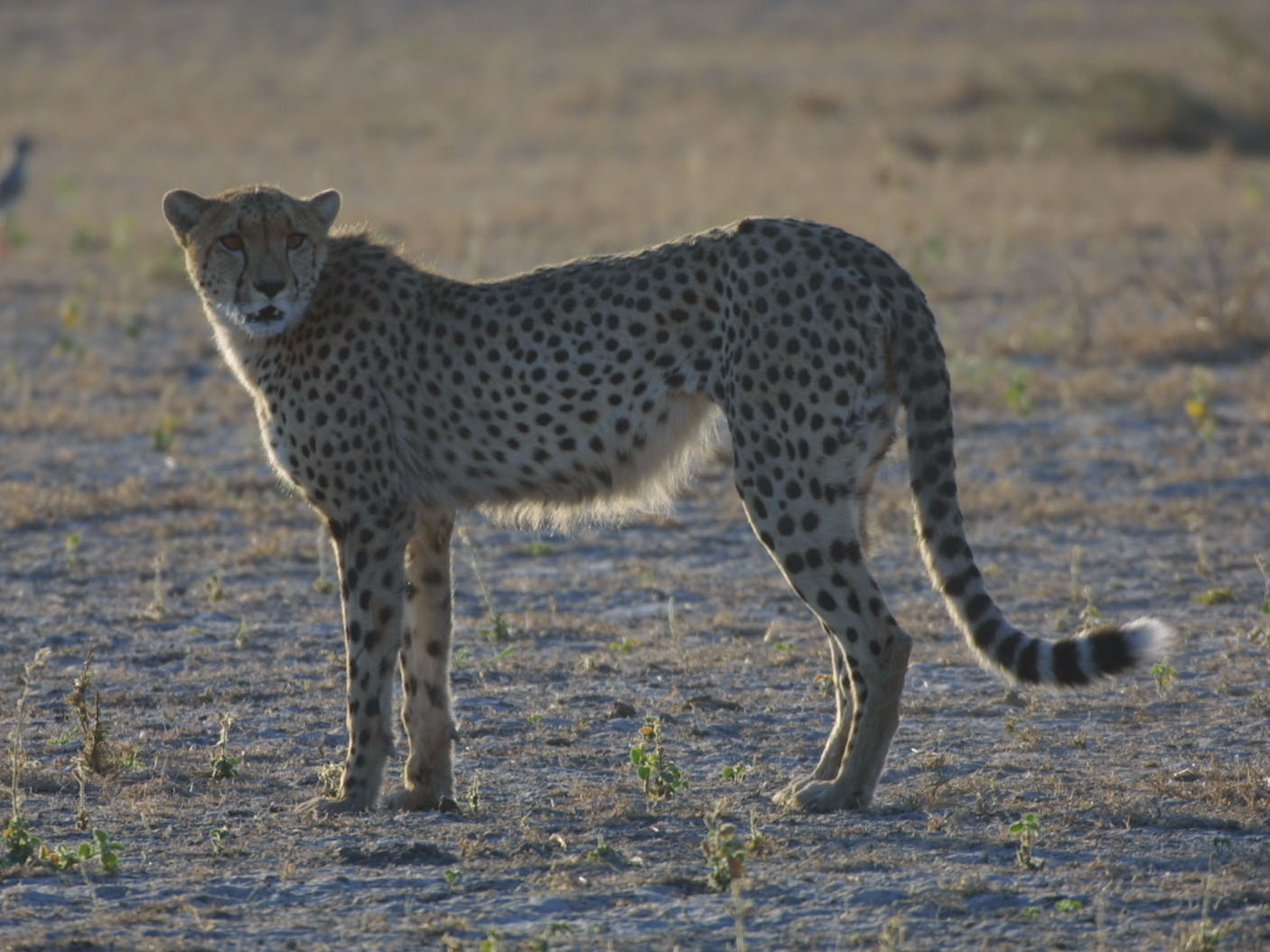
- Cheetah (Acinonyx jubatus)

Scientific classification
- Kingdom: Animalia
- Phylum: Chordata
- Class: Mammalia
- Order: Carnivora
- Family: Felidae
- Subfamily: Felinae
- Genus: Acinonyx; Brookes, 1828

Type species
- Felis jubata Schreber, 1775

Species
- Acinonyx jubatus; †Acinonyx aicha; †Acinonyx intermedius; †Acinonyx pardinensis; †Acinonyx pleistocaenicus

Synonyms
- Cynailurus Wagner, 1830; Cynofelis Lesson, 1842; Guepar Boitard, 1842; Gueparda Gray, 1843; Guepardus Duvernoy, 1834; Paracinonyx Kretzoi, 1929

= Acinonyx =

Acinonyx Temporal range: Pliocene – Holocene, 3–0 Ma

Genus of carnivores

Acinonyx is a genus of feline, the only living species of which is the cheetah (A. jubatus) that inhabits the open grasslands of Africa and Asia in parts of Iran. This genus represents a highly adapted lineage within the felids, which specialize in speed and open-terrain hunting. Evidence suggest that the Acinonyx genus evolved from other feline ancestors early on, to become specialized in stealth and running.

The main reasons for all but one species going extinct revolve around climate changes, humans driving these species out of their habitats, and their prey populations shrinking. Climate changed dramatically, starting in the Pleistocene period, making it difficult to survive in open terrain and grasslands upon which these cats depend. Human civilization also began to change and expand, resulting in lots of these species losing their homes or hunting grounds. This also forced some species to be isolated, making reproducing more difficult. Food scarcity became another consequence of human expansion as their prey were being forced from their habitats or hunted by humans. These problems played a huge role in the extinction of the historic Acinonyx species.

Fossil remains related to cheetah-like cats were excavated that date back to the late Pliocene and Middle Pleistocene, indicating a wide time range. These cats occurred across much of the old world 10,000 years ago. Some extinct species such as A. pardinensis and A. intermedius were found in parts of Europe and Asia. Several similar species classified in the genus Miracinonyx lived in North America at the same time; these may have been more closely related to the genus Puma.

A primary characteristic of this genus are bodies adapted for speed and swiftness; however, the species at the time were much different in morphology. Species found from 10,000 years ago show that these cats had a larger and more vigorous build than the cheetah, which has specialized in hunting fast prey, with a much slimmer build, enabling a quick pursuit. Acinonyx species are also unable to retract their claws fully, which can be a disadvantage in some cases. However, claws also give extra traction while running.

== Taxonomy ==
Acinonyx was proposed by Joshua Brookes in 1828.

The word Acinonyx is constructed from Greek roots. the first portion, "akinetos", translates to "unmoved" or "motionless" and the second portion "onyx" to "nail" or "claw". which represents one the main traits used to recognize this genus, not being able to retract their claws fully.

Between the late 18th century and the early 20th century, the following Acinonyx species and subspecies were described:

- Felis jubatus by Johann Christian Daniel von Schreber in 1777 was based on earlier descriptions by Comte de Buffon and Thomas Pennant.
  - Felis venatica by Griffith in 1821 was based on a sketch of a cheetah from India.
  - Cynailurus soemmeringi by Fitzinger in 1855 was a live male cheetah brought by Theodor von Heuglin to Tiergarten Schönbrunn from Kordofan in southern Sudan.
  - Acinonyx hecki by Hilzheimer in 1913 was a captive cheetah from Senegal in the Berlin Zoological Garden, named in honour of the zoo's director.

In 1993, Acinonyx was placed in the monophyletic subfamily Acinonychinae. Molecular phylogenetic analysis has shown that it is the sister group of the genus Puma, and it is now placed within the subfamily Felinae.

In addition, the following fossil Acinonyx species were described:

- Acinonyx pardinensis by Croizet et Jobert in 1828
- Acinonyx intermedius by Thenius in 1954
- Acinonyx aicha by Geraads in 1997
- Acinonyx pleistocaenicus by Zdansky in 1925

The Asiatic cheetah ("Acinonyx jubatus venaticus") is part of the last surviving lineages that are outside of Africa. Recent genetic studies have shown that this subspecies separated from African populations roughly 32,000 to 67,000 years ago, suggesting a prolonged adaptation to dry landscapes.

The "Linxia Cheetah" ("A. kurteni") was initially described by Christiansen and Mazák in 2009 on the basis of a skull from Pliocene strata in China, and touted as the most primitive member of the genus. In 2012, "A. kurteni" was invalidated as a species when the holotype was determined to be a forgery composed of Miocene-aged fragments.

The extended duration and broad range of fossil records suggests the long evolutionary presence across the old world into the present day. The fossils also suggest how the genus Acinonyx once ranged widely across Eurasia, eventually population declining to climatic shifts and the habitat being broken into different locations due to human activities.

== See also ==
- American cheetahs of the related genus Miracinonyx
