= Cope's rule =

Postulation pertaining to evolution

Cope's rule states that lineages increase in size over evolutionary time.

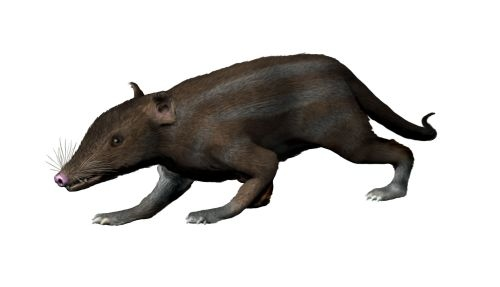
Juramaia was one of the earliest mammals, a basal eutherian from the Late Jurassic, no more than 10 cm long.

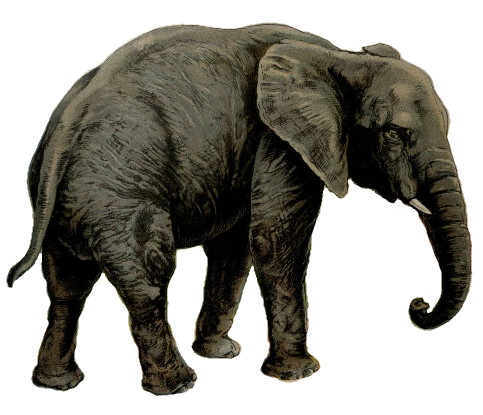
The African bush elephant, a modern mammal, may reach a height of almost 4 metres.

Cope's rule, named after American paleontologist Edward Drinker Cope, postulates that population lineages tend to increase in body size over evolutionary time. It was never actually stated by Cope, although he favoured the occurrence of linear evolutionary trends. It is sometimes also known as the Cope–Depéret rule, because Charles Depéret explicitly advocated the idea. Theodor Eimer had also done so earlier. The term "Cope's rule" was apparently coined by Bernhard Rensch, based on the fact that Depéret had "lionized Cope" in his book. (Note: In his paper, Rensch reproduced an erroneous citation of a work of Cope's (that he apparently had not read) from the English translation of Depéret's book.) While the rule has been demonstrated in many instances, it does not hold true at all taxonomic levels, or in all clades. Larger body size is associated with increased fitness for a number of reasons, although there are also some disadvantages both on an individual and on a clade level: clades comprising larger individuals are more prone to extinction, which may act to limit the maximum size of organisms.

== Function ==
=== Effects of growth ===
Directional selection appears to act on organisms' size, whereas it exhibits a far smaller effect on other morphological traits, though it is possible that this perception may be a result of sample bias. This selectional pressure can be explained by a number of advantages, both in terms of mating success and survival rate.

For example, larger organisms find it easier to avoid or fight off predators and capture prey, to reproduce, to kill competitors, to survive temporary lean times, and to resist rapid climatic changes. They may also potentially benefit from better thermal efficiency, increased intelligence, and a longer lifespan.

Offsetting these advantages, larger organisms require more food and water, and shift from r to K-selection. Their longer generation time means a longer period of reliance on the mother, and on a macroevolutionary scale restricts the clade's ability to evolve rapidly in response to changing environments.

=== Capping growth ===
Left unfettered, the trend of ever-larger size would produce organisms of gargantuan proportions. Therefore, some factors must limit this process. At one level, it is possible that the clade's increased vulnerability to extinction, as its members become larger, means that no taxon survives long enough for individuals to reach huge sizes. There are probably also physically imposed limits to the size of some organisms; for instance, insects must be small enough for oxygen to diffuse to all parts of their bodies, flying birds must be light enough to fly, and the length of giraffes' necks may be limited by the blood pressure it is possible for their hearts to generate. Finally, there may be a competitive element, in that changes in size are necessarily accompanied by changes in ecological niche. For example, terrestrial carnivores over 21 kg almost always prey on organisms larger, not smaller, than themselves. If such a niche is already occupied, competitive pressure may oppose the directional selection. The three Canidae clades (Hesperocyoninae, Borophaginae, and Caninae) all show a trend towards larger size, although the first two are now extinct.

== Validity ==
Cope recognised that clades of Cenozoic mammals appeared to originate as small individuals, and that body mass increased through a clade's history. Discussing the case of canid evolution in North America, Blaire Van Valkenburgh of UCLA and coworkers state:

Cope's rule, or the evolutionary trend toward larger body size, is common among mammals. Large size enhances the ability to avoid predators and capture prey, enhances reproductive success, and improves thermal efficiency. Moreover, in large carnivores, interspecific competition for food tends to be relatively intense, and bigger species tend to dominate and kill smaller competitors. Progenitors of hypercarnivorous lineages may have started as relatively small-bodied scavengers of large carcasses, similar to foxes and coyotes, with selection favoring both larger size and enhanced craniodental adaptations for meat eating. Moreover, the evolution of predator size is likely to be influenced by changes in prey size, and a significant trend toward larger size has been documented for large North American mammals, including both herbivores and carnivores, in the Cenozoic.

In some cases, the increase in body size may represent a passive, rather than an active, trend. In other words, the maximum size increases, but the minimum size does not; this is usually a result of size varying pseudo-randomly rather than directed evolution. This does not fall into Cope's rule sensu stricto, but is considered by many workers to be an example of "Cope's rule sensu lato". In other cases, an increase in size may in fact represent a transition to an optimal body size, and not imply that populations always develop to a larger size.

However, many palaeobiologists are skeptical of the validity of Cope's rule, which may merely represent a statistical artefact. Purported examples of Cope's rule often assume that the stratigraphic age of fossils is proportional to their "clade rank", a measure of how derived they are from an ancestral state; this relationship is in fact quite weak. Counterexamples to Cope's rule are common throughout geological time; although size increase does occur more often than not, it is by no means universal. For example, among genera of Cretaceous molluscs, an increase in size is no more common than stasis or a decrease. In many cases, Cope's rule only operates at certain taxonomic levels (for example, an order may obey Cope's rule, while its constituent families do not), or more generally, it may apply to only some clades of a taxon. Giant dinosaurs appear to have evolved dozens of times, in response to local environmental conditions.

Despite many counter-examples, Cope's rule is supported in many instances. For example, all marine invertebrate phyla except the molluscs show a size increase between the Cambrian and Permian. Collectively, dinosaurs exhibit an increase in body length over their evolution. Cope's rule also appears to hold in clades where a constraint on size is expected. For instance, one may expect the size of birds to be constrained, as larger masses mean more energy must be expended in flight. Birds have been suggested to follow Cope's law, although a subsequent reanalysis of the same data suggested otherwise.

An extensive study published in 2015 supports the presence of a trend toward larger body size in marine animals during the Phanerozoic. However, this trend was present mainly in the Paleozoic and Cenozoic; the Mesozoic was a period of relative stasis. The trend is not attributable simply to neutral drift in body size from small ancestors, and was mainly driven by a greater rate of diversification in classes of larger mean size. A smaller component of the overall trend is due to trends of increasing size within individual families.
