= Deng Tao =

Chinese paleontologist (born 1963)

- Born: June 1963 (age 63); Yibin, Sichuan, China
- Education: Peking University
- Known for: Woolly rhinoceros
- Scientific career
- Fields: Vertebrate paleontology, evolution, biostratigraphy
- Workplaces: Institute of Vertebrate Paleontology and Paleoanthropology

Deng Tao (Chinese: 邓涛; born June 1963) is a Chinese palaeontologist at the Institute of Vertebrate Paleontology and Paleoanthropology (IVPP), Chinese Academy of Sciences, who has made important fossil discoveries on Cenozoic mammals. He is a professor of vertebrate palaeontology, deputy director of the Academic Committee, and deputy director of Key Laboratory of Evolutionary Systematics of Vertebrates at IVPP.

== Education ==
Deng was born in Yibin, Sichuan, China. He studied at Peking University from where he obtained BS in 1984. He completed MS from Southwest Petroleum University in 1994. He obtained PhD from the Northwest University in 1997.

== Professional career ==
Deng works at the Institute of Vertebrate Paleontology and Paleoanthropology as a researcher and PhD supervisor. His specialization is in the study of mammalian fossils, biostratigraphy, and environmental changes during the Late Cenozoic. Deng currently assumes several positions, including deputy director for the Academic Committee of IVPP, and professor of palaeontology at the graduate school of the Chinese Academy of Sciences. He is also the deputy editor-in-chief of two technical journals, Vertebrata PalAsiatica and Evolution of Life.

== Research achievements ==
Deng has published more than 120 technical papers on palaeontology. He and his team had first major breakthrough in the Zanda Basin, from where they discovered fossil materials of Tibetan wooly rhinoceros (Coelodonta antiquitatis) on 22 August 2007. After painstaking excavation, they unearthed the skull, jaw bone and cervical vertebra of the adult wooly rhinoceros. An analysis through animal group comparison and paleomagnetic test indicated the fossil's geological age to be about 3.7 million years old and in the middle of the Pliocene. Their research eventually lead to in-depth knowledge of the dramatic rising of the Qinghai-Tibet Plateau and its great impact to evolution of mammals with respect to climate changes. His team reported in 2011 that the Qinghai-Tibetan Plateau is actually the place of origin of the woolly rhinos during the Pliocene Ice Age, from where they evolved and spread out into other Asian and European regions.

In 2012 he and his team reported the discovery of a 4.6 million-year-old three-toed horse Hipparion zandaense from Tibet. In 2013 they discovered Sinotherium lagrelii from Linxia Basin in Linxia County, Gansu Province, a transitional fossil in the lineage of one-horned rhinoceros, the basis of the unicorn legend in the region; and a new hornless rhino Aceratherium porpani from Thailand.

In 2021, Tao Deng and his colleagues Xiaokang Lu and Shanqin Chen discovered a new Paraceratherium species in the Linxia Basin which they named Paraceratherium linxiaense.

=== Discrediting forged fossil ===
Deng was on the news headline around the world for revealing a fossil forgery, Acinonyx kurteni or the Lynxia cheetah. The cheetah was reported in 2009, and was claimed to be the oldest true cheetah species ever discovered. Deng was the first to note the unusual fossil description while proofreading the manuscript for publication of the discovery in the Proceedings of the National Academy of Sciences, USA. He immediately reported to PNAS that parts of the skull had been concocted from plaster, and that pieces of bones looked like being glued together to create a unique skull. However, his objection to publication was rejected as he had no direct examination of the fossil. After years of arguments in the scientific community, it was only in 2012 that Deng was allowed access to the original fossil upon invoking the PNAS data access policy, and on examination, his primary suspicions were proven correct, that the fossil was a deliberate fake. On 20 August 2012 one of the authors, Ji H. Mazák finally made a retraction in PNAS.

== Awards and honours ==
Deng was awarded with the Chinese national prize for outstanding dissertation in 2000.

== Publications ==
- Tao Deng and Xue Xiangxu (1999). Chinese Fossil Horses of Equus and Their Environment. China Scientific Books.
- Tao Deng (2000). Eighth China Vertebrate Paleontology Annual Meeting Proceedings (Chinese Edition). Ocean Publications. ISBN 978-7502753702
- Tao Deng (2000). Scientific Journey: to Search for Traces of the Ancient Beasts (Chinese Edition). Shanghai Science and Technology Press. ISBN 978-7547809334
- Tao Deng (2010). Proceedings of the Eighth Annual Meeting of the Chinese Society of Vertebrate Paleontology. China Scientific Books. ISBN 7-5027-5370-2
- Tao Deng (2013). (With Zhan-xiang Qiu, Zhu-ding Qiu, Chuan-kui Li, Zhao-qun Zhang, Ban-yue Wang, and Xiao-ming Wang) Neogene Land Mammal Stages/Ages of China: Toward the Goal to Establish an Asian Land Mammal Stage/Age Scheme. (With Zhan-xiang Qiu, Ban-yue Wang, Xiao-ming Wang, and Su-kuan Hou) Late Cenozoic Biostratigraphy of the Linxia Basin, Northwestern China. (With Xiao-ming Wang, Qiang Li, Zhu-ding Qiu, Guang-pu Xie, Ban-yue Wang, Zhan-xiang Qiu, Zhijie J. Tseng, and Gary T. Takeuchi) Neogene Mammalian Biostratigraphy and Geochronology of the Tibetan Plateau. In: Fossil Mammals of Asia: Neogene Biostratigraphy and Chronology. Columbia University Press. ISBN 978-0-231-15012-5
