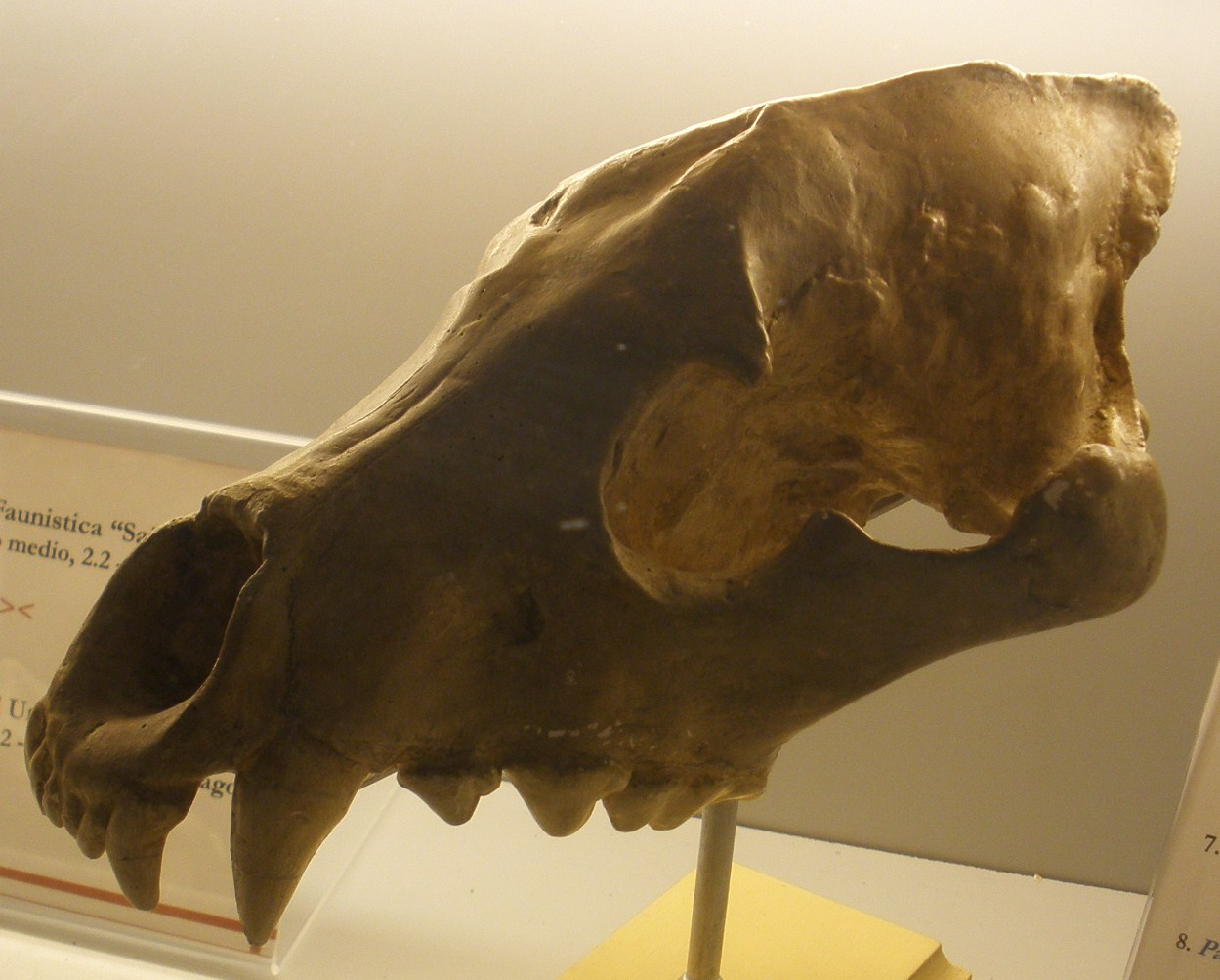
- Skull

Scientific classification
- Kingdom: Animalia
- Phylum: Chordata
- Class: Mammalia
- Order: Carnivora
- Family: Hyaenidae
- Genus: †Pliocrocuta; Kretzoi, 1938

Species
- Pliocrocuta perrieri

= Pliocrocuta =

Pliocrocuta Temporal range: Pliocene–Early Pleistocene

Extinct genus of carnivores

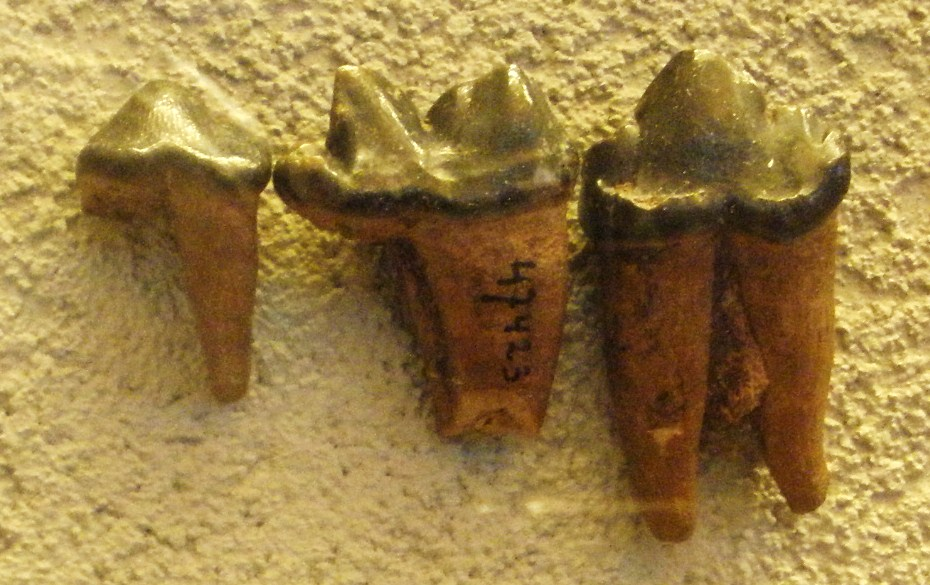
Teeth

Pliocrocuta is an extinct genus of hyena. It contains the species Pliocrocuta perrieri, known from the Pliocene to Early Pleistocene of Eurasia and possibly Africa. It is possibly ancestral to Pachycrocuta, with some authors including P. perrieri within Pachycrocuta. It is largely known from cranial remains. The species is estimated to have weighed around 56 kilograms (123 lb) on average, with its skull showing evidence for adaptation to bone cracking. It may have been solitary, unlike living bone cracking spotted hyenas.

P. perrieri first appeared during the Pliocene, around 4.2 million years ago. In the earliest Pleistocene (2.6-2 million years ago) of Europe, Pliocrocuta lived alongside the fellow hyena Chasmaporthetes, the sabertooth cats Megantereon and Homotherium, the giant cheetah Acinonyx pardinensis, the cougar-relative Puma pardoides, the primitive lynx Lynx issiodorensis, the bear Ursus etruscus, and the wild dog Xenocyon falconeri. Pliocrocuta became extinct in Europe around 2 million years ago as part of a major faunal turnover event where many European animals became extinct and were replaced by immigrants from elsewhere, with Pliocrocuta being replaced by Pachycrocuta in this transition.
