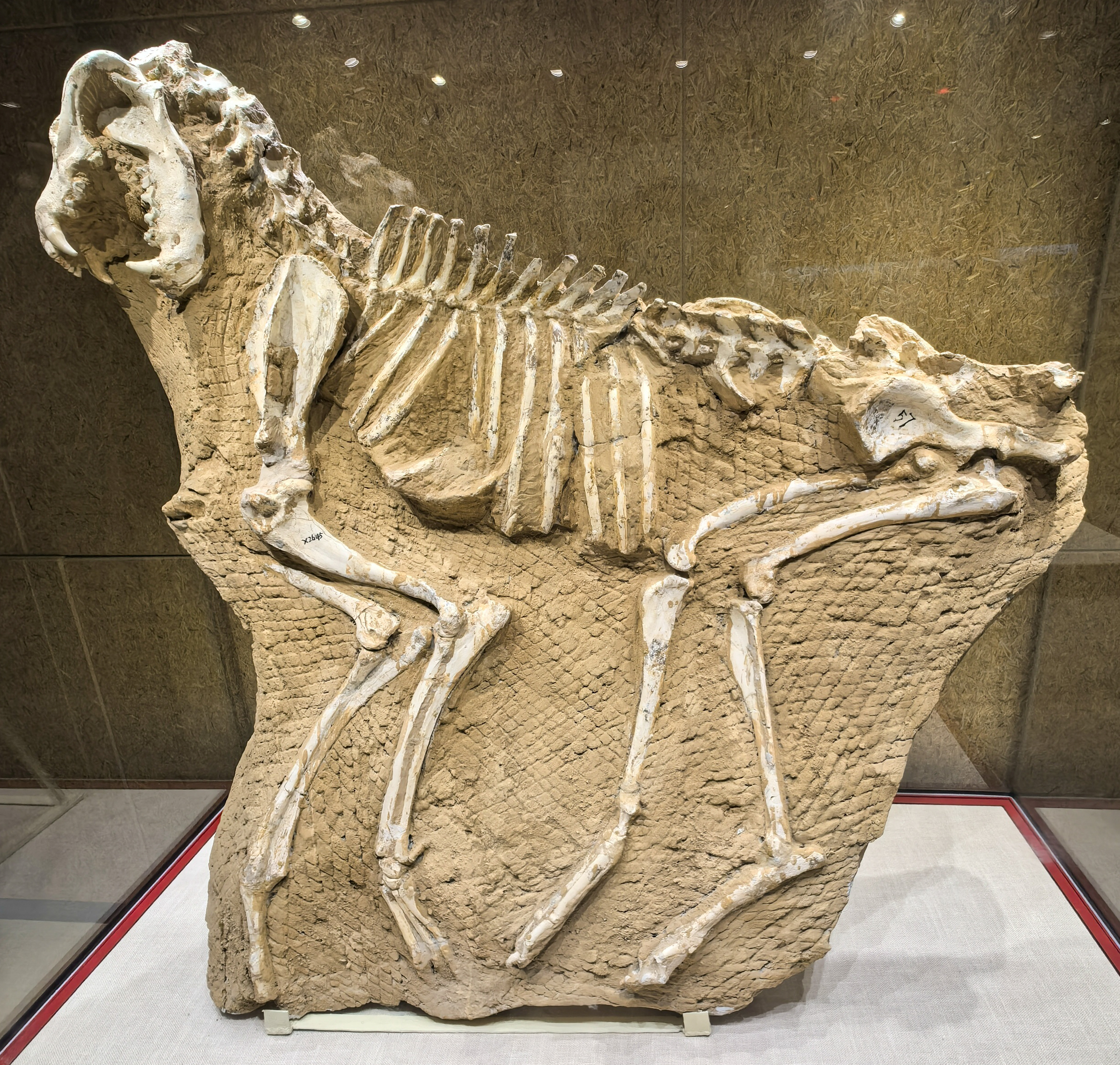
- C. progressus skeleton at Hezheng Paleozoological Museum

Scientific classification
- Kingdom: Animalia
- Phylum: Chordata
- Class: Mammalia
- Order: Carnivora
- Family: Hyaenidae
- Subfamily: Hyaeninae
- Genus: †Chasmaporthetes; Hay, 1921

Species
- See text

Synonyms
- Ailuriaena johnstoni Stirton & Christian, 1940; Euryboas

= Chasmaporthetes =

Chasmaporthetes Temporal range: Pliocene–Early Pleistocene

Extinct genus of carnivores

Chasmaporthetes, also known as hunting or running hyena, is an extinct genus of hyenas distributed in Eurasia, North America, and Africa during the Pliocene-Pleistocene epochs, living from 4.9 million to 780,000 years ago, existing for about 4.12 million years.

The genus probably arose from Eurasian Miocene hyenas such as Thalassictis or Lycyaena, with C. borissiaki being the oldest known representative. The species C. ossifragus was the only hyena to cross the Bering land bridge into the Americas, and ranged over what is now Arizona and Mexico during Blancan and early Irvingtonian Land Mammal ages, between 5.0 and 1.5 million years ago.

Chasmaporthetes was one of the so-called "dog-like" hyenas (of which the aardwolf is the only survivor), a hyaenid group which, in contrast to the now more common "bone-crushing" hyenas, evolved into slender-limbed, cursorial hunters like modern canids.

== Taxonomy and etymology ==
Chasmaporthetes was named (from chasm and the Greek πορθευτής (portheutes), "destroyer, ravager") by Hay (1921), who noted that the name meant that the North American species, Chasmaporthetes ossifragus (the type species) possibly saw the beginning of the Grand Canyon.

=== Species ===
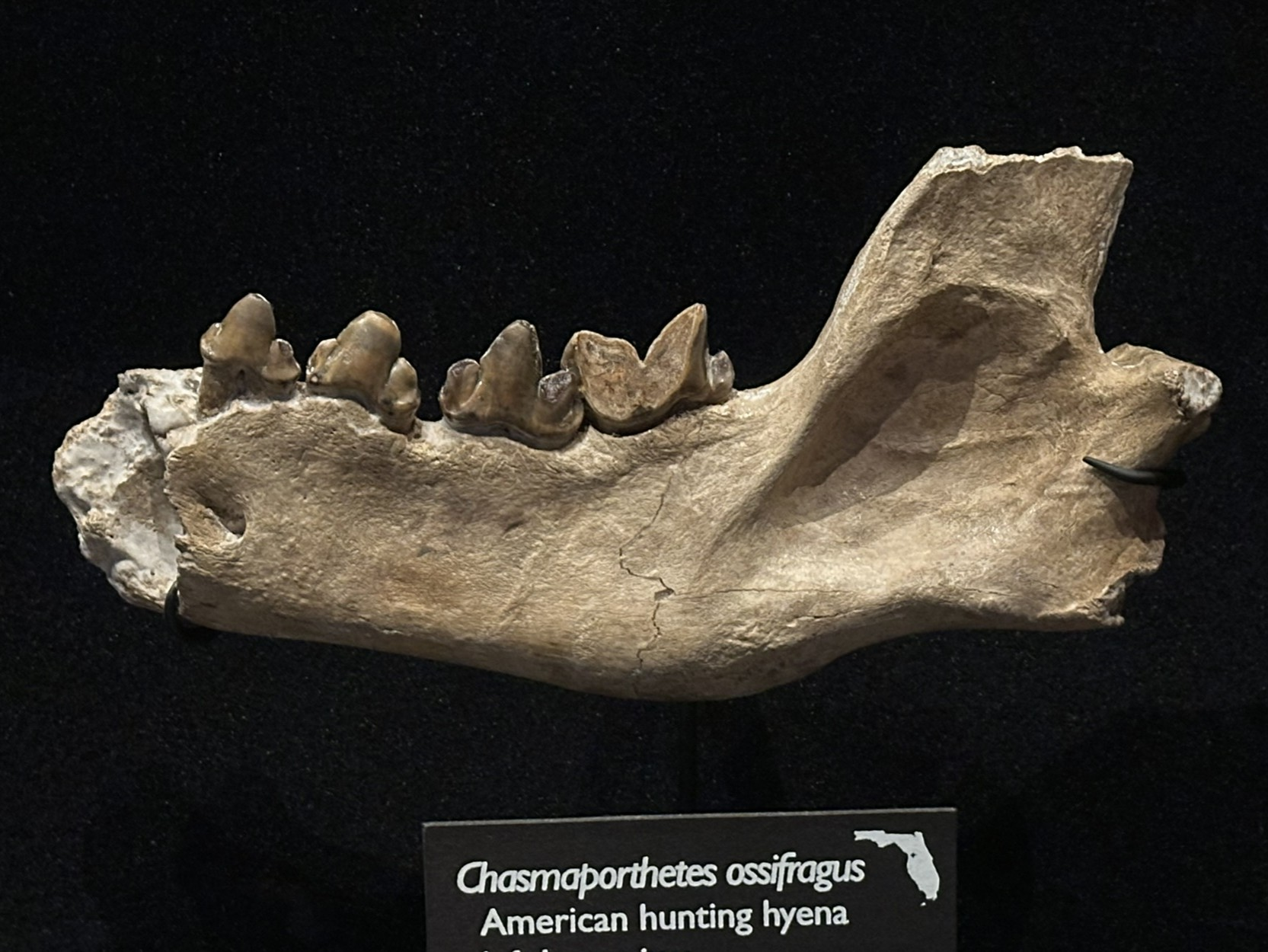
Fossil jaw of C. ossifragus, the only American species (FLMNH)

At least nine species are currently recognised:

- Chasmaporthetes ossifragus Hay, 1921 - North America, Pliocene to Pleistocene
- C. australis Hendey, 1974 - Africa, Late Miocene
- C. bonisi Koufos, 1987 - Greece, Late Miocene
- C. borissiaki Khomenko, 1932 - Russia, Pliocene (disputed)
- C. exitelus Kurtén & Werdelin, 1988 - China, Late Miocene
- C. gangsriensis Tseng, Li, & Wang, 2013 - Asia, Early Pliocene
- C. lunensis Del Campana, 1914 - Eurasia, Late Miocene to Early Pleistocene
- C. melei Rook et al, 2004 - Sardinia, Early Pleistocene
- C. nitidula Geraads, 1997 - Africa, Pliocene to Early Pleistocene

== Palaeobiology ==
=== Anatomy ===
The limb bones of Chasmaporthetes were long and slender like those of cheetahs. The cheek teeth were slender and sharp-edged like those of felids. It likely inhabited open ground and was a daytime hunter. C. ossifragus is estimated at 99 kilograms (218 lb) in weight.

=== Diet ===
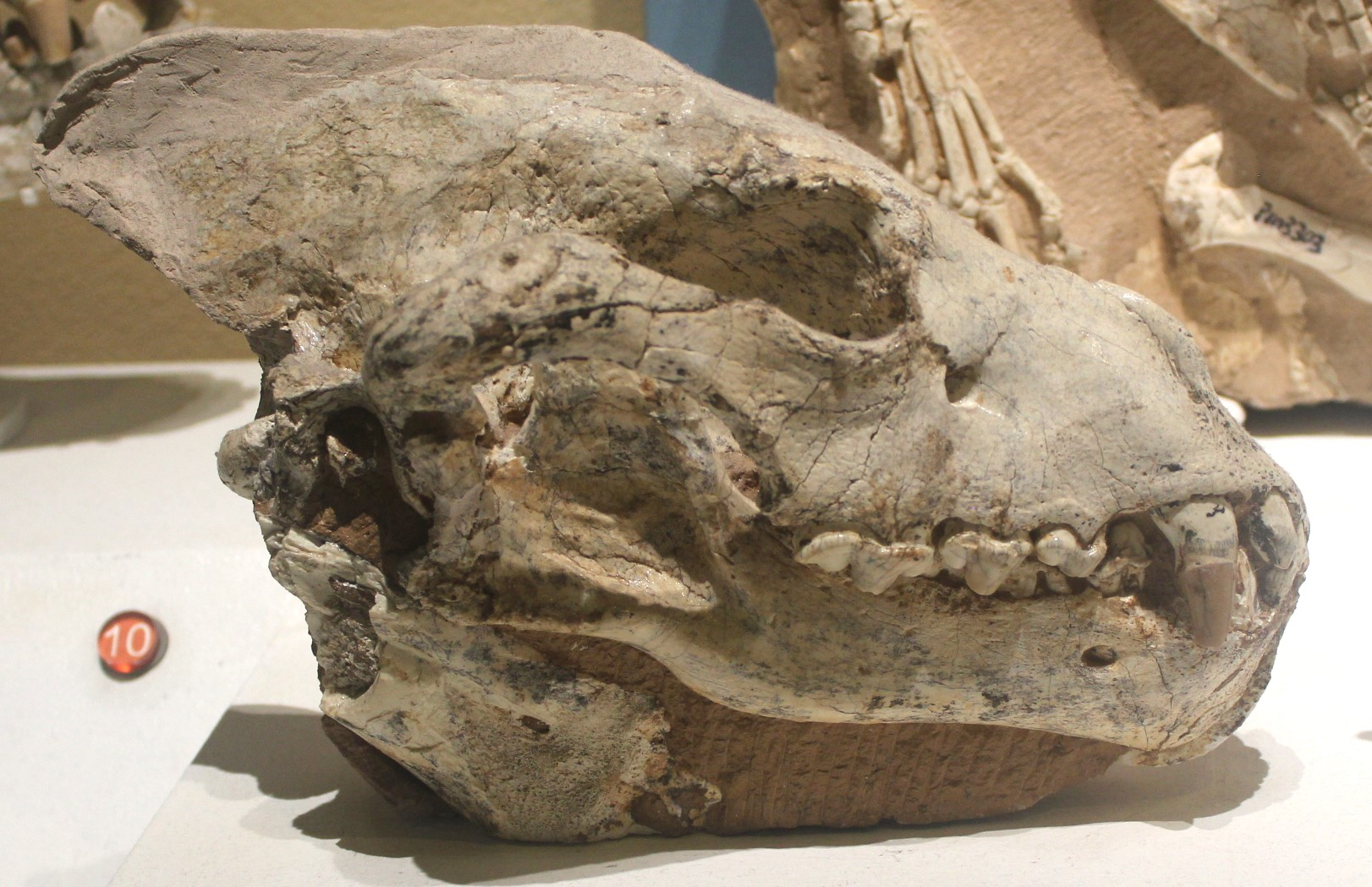
C. progressus skull, National Natural History Museum of China

Relative to the body size of the species, the skull of C. lunensis was superbly adapted for dissipating stresses generated by struggling prey. The European C. lunensis is regarded as an active group hunter of medium-sized ungulates. It may have preyed on the small Bourbon gazelle (Gazella borbonica) and the chamois antelope (Procamptoceras brivatense). The North American C. ossifragus was similar in build to C. lunensis, but had slightly more robust jaws and teeth. It may have preyed on the giant marmot Paenemarmota.

A study on the genus' premolar intercuspid notches indicated Chasmaporthetes was likely hypercarnivorous rather than durophagous as its modern cousins (excluding the aardwolf) are. The microstructure of the enamel of C. lunensis lunensis consists of more gently folding enamel than that found in bone-crushing hyaenids, further supporting the notion that it was not a specialist osteophage. Dental microwear of C. australis from Langebaanweg in South Africa shows that the species was hypercarnivorous and rarely engaged in durophagy; its dental microwear was similar to the modern lion, which seldom consumes bone.

=== Competition ===
An Early Pleistocene skull of C. lunensis from Spain displays bite marks most likely inflicted by a conspecific, although these bite marks may have also been left by a Pliocrocuta or a felid. In Europe, C. lunensis also competed with Acinonyx pardinensis, the giant cheetah. In North America, C. ossifragus competed with the far more numerous Borophagus diversidens.
