= Acinonyx aicha =

Acinonyx aicha Temporal range: Pliocene

Scientific classification
- Kingdom: Animalia
- Phylum: Chordata
- Class: Mammalia
- Order: Carnivora
- Family: Felidae
- Subfamily: Felinae
- Genus: Acinonyx
- Species: †A. aicha

Binomial name
- †Acinonyx aicha Geraads, 1997

Extinct species of mammal

Acinonyx aicha is an extinct felid species belonging to the genus Acinonyx. It was first described in 1997 based on fossils from the Pliocene of Morocco.

== Discovery and naming ==
Acinonyx aicha was discovered in the Ahl al Oughlam site in Morocco, from the late Pliocene. It is known from the holotype AaO-1456 which is a complete and disfigured skull, as well as maxilla and some teeth. The specific name is derived from a cheetah called Ayesha from Tintin, specifically from The Red Sea Sharks.

== Description ==
The cranial lacks a strong convexity compared to other species, such as the cheetah, and the zygomatic arch also suggest a normal temporal fossa. The skull also includes a very concave glenoid cavity, which is limited by a string rim. The upper teeth are longer than Acinonyx pardinensis and longer relative to the width, and the anterior tubercle is much less developed compared to the posterior, especially compared to other species.
