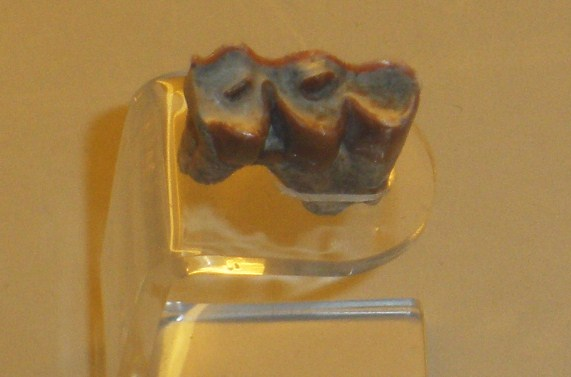
- Fossilized teeth of G. borbonica

Scientific classification
- Kingdom: Animalia
- Phylum: Chordata
- Class: Mammalia
- Order: Artiodactyla
- Family: Bovidae
- Subfamily: Antilopinae
- Genus: Gazella
- Species: †G. borbonica

Binomial name
- †Gazella borbonica Depéret, 1884

Synonyms
- Gazella anglica Newton, 1884; Gazella daviesii Hinton, 1906; Gazella fucinii del Campana, 1918; Gazella julienii Munier-Chalmas, 1889; Gazella schreuderae Hooijer, 1945

= Gazella borbonica =

Gazella borbonica Temporal range: 2.14–1.8 Ma

Extinct species of mammal

Gazella borbonica is an extinct gazelle which existed in Europe during the Early Pleistocene epoch. It was described by Charles Depéret in 1884. It had rather long, moderately divergent and slightly recurved horns and was about the same size as the modern Dorcas Gazelle, with a shoulder height of about 60 centimetres (24 in). Fossil remains have been found in Italy, France, the Netherlands and south-east England. Taxonomic synonyms include Gazella anglica Newton, 1884 and Gazella daviesii Hinton, 1906. The species was the last surviving gazelle in Europe, with the species becoming extinct around 1.8 million years ago.
