= Acinonyx intermedius =

Scientific classification
- Domain: Eukaryota
- Kingdom: Animalia
- Phylum: Chordata
- Class: Mammalia
- Order: Carnivora
- Suborder: Feliformia
- Family: Felidae
- Subfamily: Felinae
- Genus: Acinonyx
- Species: †A. intermedius

Binomial name
- †Acinonyx intermedius Thenius, 1954

Fossil species of cheetah

Acinonyx intermedius is a fossil species of felid belonging to the cheetah genus Acinonyx. It has been found in Olduvai, Tanzania and in cave sites in South Africa. It was described by paleontologist Thenius in 1954. It is sometimes considered part of Acinonyx pardinensis (where that species is considered a macrospecies) as A. p. intermedius.
