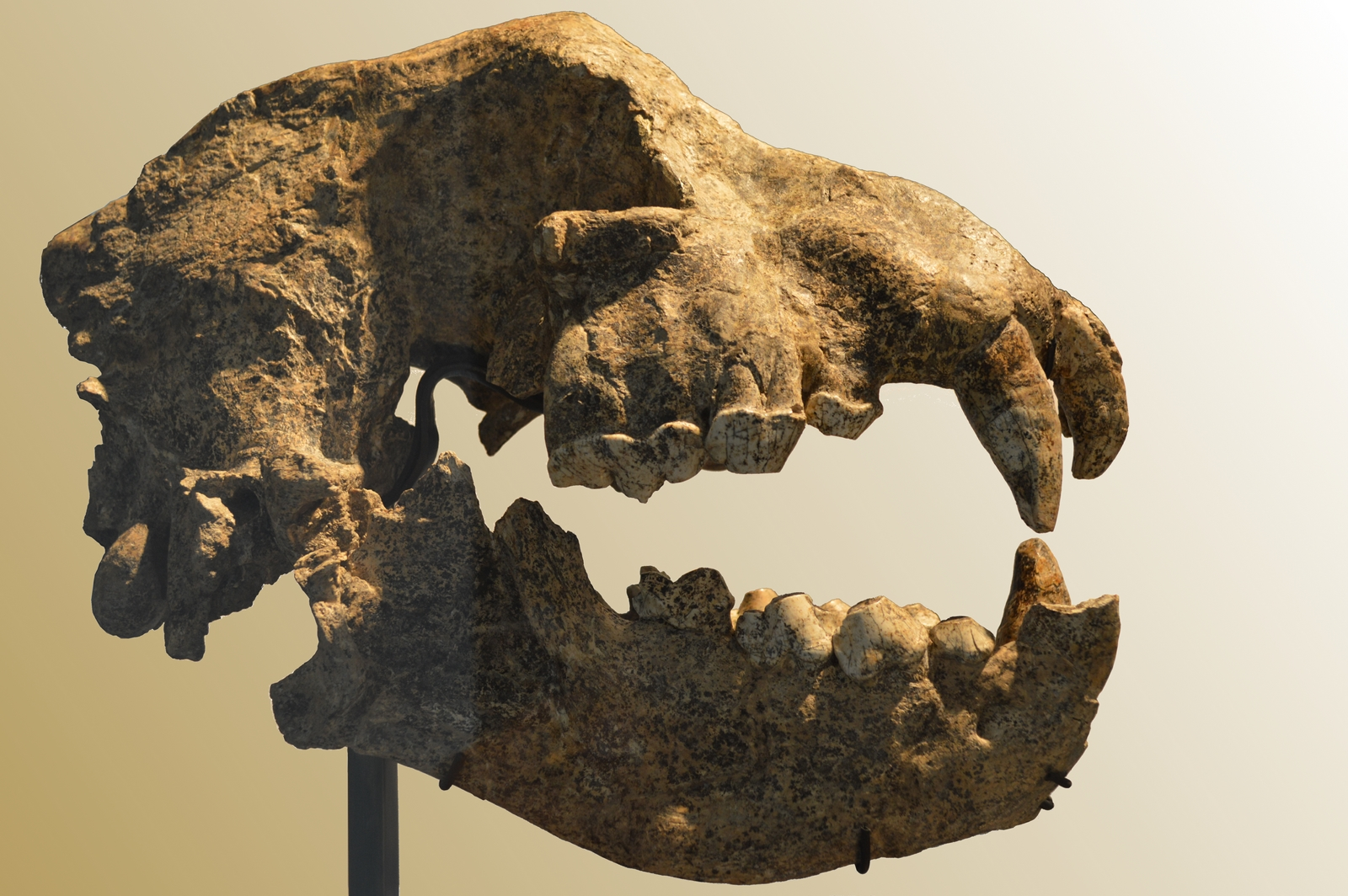
- Cast of the holotype skull at the Musée Crozatier

Scientific classification
- Kingdom: Animalia
- Phylum: Chordata
- Class: Mammalia
- Order: Carnivora
- Family: Hyaenidae
- Genus: †Pachycrocuta; Kretzoi 1938
- Species: †P. brevirostris

Binomial name
- †Pachycrocuta brevirostris (Gervais, 1850)

Possible species
- ?†"Hyaena" prisca; ?†Pachycrocuta bellax; ?Parahyaena brunnea; ?†Pliocrocuta perrieri

= Pachycrocuta =

Pachycrocuta Temporal range: Pliocene to Middle Pleistocene, 5.33–0.5 Ma

Extinct genus of large hyena

Pachycrocuta is an extinct genus of hyena. The largest and most well-researched species is Pachycrocuta brevirostris, colloquially known as the giant short-faced hyena as it stood about 90–100 cm (35–39 in) at the shoulder and it is estimated to have averaged 110 kg (240 lb) in weight, approaching the size of a lioness, making it the largest known undisputed hyena, only exceeded in size by the possible hyena Dinocrocuta. It is often hypothesised to have been a specialised kleptoparasitic scavenger, using its imposing size to force other predators off of carcasses, though some authors have suggested they may have been effective pack hunters like living spotted hyenas.

The precise time of the origin of the genus depends on what species are included, though the only unquestioned species of the genus, P. brevirostris, had emerged by the Early Pleistocene (around 2.6-2 million years ago). Around 800,000 years ago at the end of the Early Pleistocene, it became locally extinct in Europe, with it surviving in East Asia until at least 500,000 years ago, and possibly later elsewhere in Asia. A number of causal factors for the extinction of P. brevirostris have been proposed, including climatic changes and the extinction of the contemporaneous saber-tooth cat Megantereon.

== Taxonomy ==
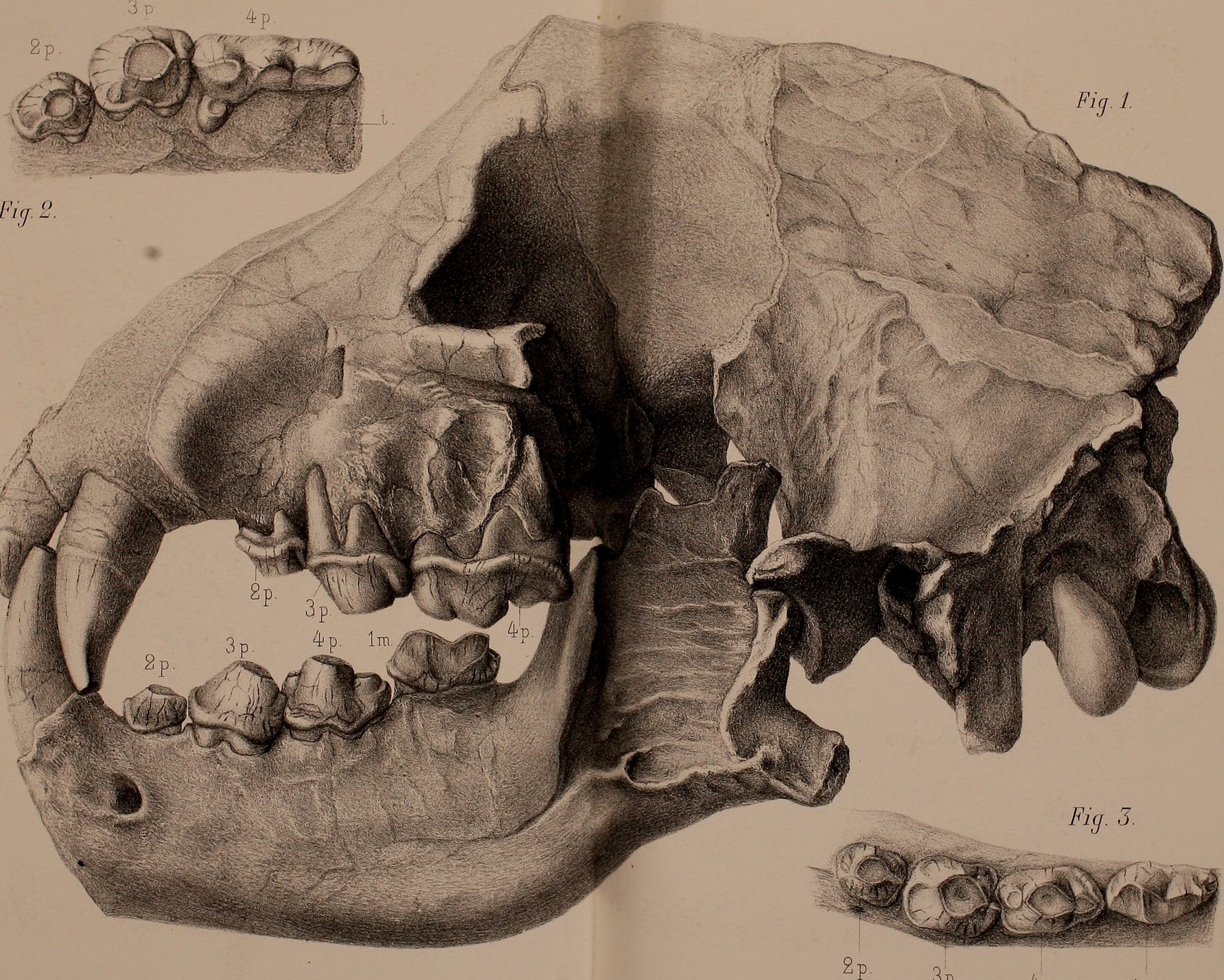
Skull illustration from 1893

The first identified fossil of the short-faced hyena was discovered in Le Puy, Auvergne, France, in 1845 by French paleontologist Auguste Aymard. In 1850, French paleontologist Paul Gervais made it the holotype specimen of a new species, Hyaena brevirostris. But, in 1893, while writing a much more detailed description, French paleontologist Marcellin Boule mistakenly listed Aymard as the species authority instead of Gervais, citing volume 12 of Aymard's Annales de la Société d'Agriculture, Sciences, Arts et Commerce du Puy which does not mention the species at all. Boule further gave the annal's publication date as 1846 instead of the correct 1848. The fallacious authority Aymard, 1846, was reprinted for over a century until Spanish paleontologist David M. Alba and colleagues on behalf of the International Code of Zoological Nomenclature convincingly disproved it in 2013.

The short-faced hyena was usually relegated to the genus Hyaena alongside the modern striped hyena and brown hyena. In 1938, Hungarian paleontologist Miklós Kretzoi suggested erecting a new genus for it, Pachycrocuta, but this only became popular after Giovanni Ficcarelli and Danilo Torres' review of hyena classification in 1970. They, like many priors, placed Pachycrocuta as ancestral to Crocuta (the modern spotted hyena).

Dozens more short-faced hyena remains have been found across Europe. In 1828, Jean-Baptiste Croizet and Antoine Claude Gabriel Jobert created the species "H. perrieri" for a specimen from Montagne de Perrier, France. In 1889, German paleontologist Karl Weithofer described "H. robusta" based on a specimen from Olivola, Tuscany, Italy, but Boule quickly synonymized it with "H." brevirostris in 1893. In 1890, French paleontologist Charles Depéret erected "H. pyrenaica" based on a specimen from Roussillon. Short-faced hyenas were also being discovered in East Asia. In 1870, English naturalist Richard Owen described a Chinese specimen as "H." sinensis. In 1908, French paleoanthropologist Eugène Dubois described a Javan one as "H. bathygnatha". In 1934, Chinese paleoanthropologist Pei Wenzhong described another Chinese one, "H." licenti, from the Nihewan Basin. In 1954, mammalogist R. F. Ewer described "P." bellax" from Kromdraai, South Africa. In 1956, Finnish paleontologist Björn Kurtén identified the subspecies "H. b. neglecta" from Jammu, India (he also chose to classify several other short-faced hyenas as subspecies of brevirostris.) In 1970 Ficcarelli and Torres relegated these to Pachycrocuta, though "P. perrieri" is sometimes split off into a different genus, Pliocrocuta, erected by Kretzoi in 1938. In 2001, P. brevirostris was identified in Gladysvale Cave, South Africa.

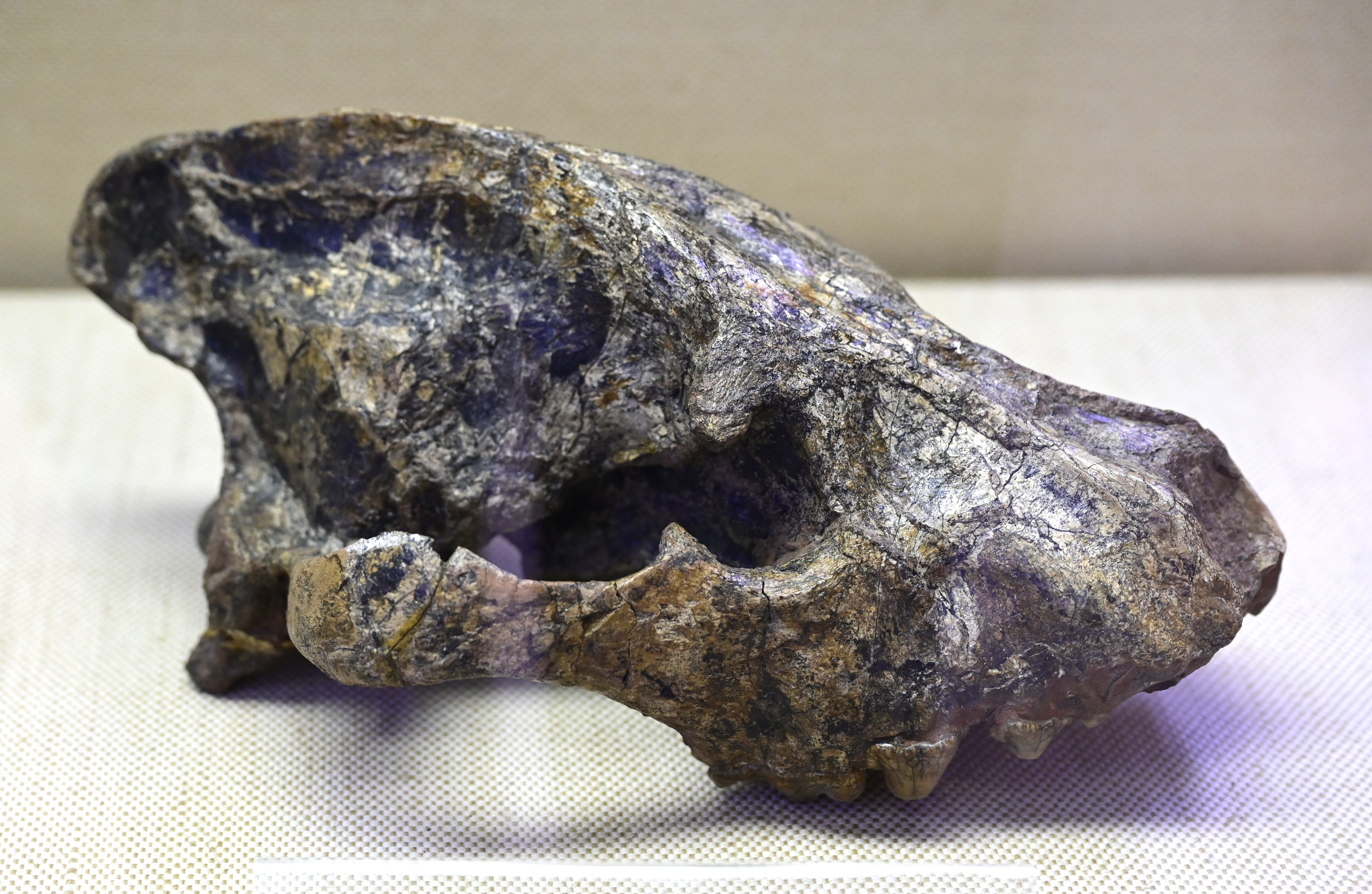
Holotype of P. b. licenti (IVPP V4033), Paleozoological Museum of China

Usually, no more than one or two Asian short-faced hyenas were considered distinct from the European P. brevirostris. The two species convention was especially popular among Chinese scientists. As the 20th century progressed, they were often classified as regional subspecies of P. brevirostris, with P. b. brevirostris endemic to Europe, and P. b. licenti and P. b. sinensis to China. In 2021, Chinese paleontologist Liu Jinyi and colleagues reported the largest ever short-faced hyena skull from Jinniushan, Northeast China, belonging to P. b. brevirostris, demonstrating the subspecies is not endemic to Europe. They suggested P. b. licenti (Middle Villafranchian) evolved into P. b. brevirostris (Late Villafranchian), which evolved into P. b. sinensis (Galerian). Relict populations of P. b. licenti seem to have persisted for some time in southern China while P. b. brevirostris had replaced most other populations. Liu and colleagues were unsure how other supposed subspecies fit into this paradigm.

The taxonomic position of Pachycrocuta relative to modern hyenas is debated. A 2008 study suggested that it was most closely related to the spotted hyena (Croctuta crocuta) among living hyenas. Conversely, in a 2024 analysis of metric data for teeth, Pérez-Claros argued that the brown hyena (Parahyaena brunnea) was its closest living relative, and along with the extinct Pliocrocuta and "Hyaena" prisca should be included within Pachycrocuta. A later 2025 study continued to regard Pliocrocuta and the brown hyena as separate from Pachycrocuta, and P. brevirostris as the only valid Eurasian species of the genus.

== Description ==
Size comparison

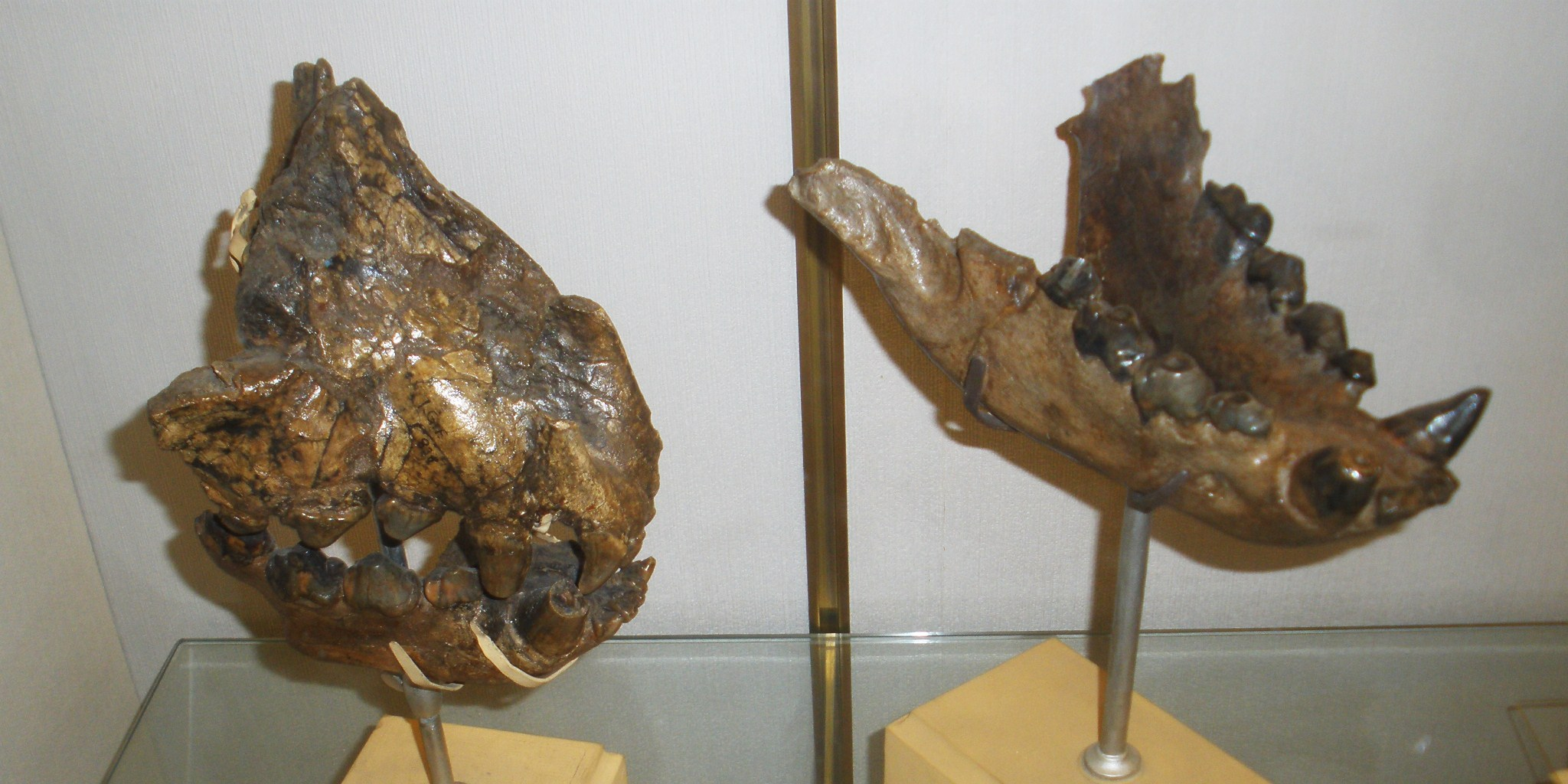
Partial skull and lower jaws

Pachycroctua brevirostris was one of the largest hyenas; only Dinocrocuta gigantea (which may be a true hyena or a member of the closely related extinct family Percrocutidae) grew larger. Two adult individuals from Zhoukoudian were estimated to be around 90 and 100 cm (2 ft 11 in and 3 ft 3 in) at the shoulder respectively, though some European individuals may have been somewhat larger. The average individual is suggested to have been around 100 kg (220 lb), while very large individuals may have reached 150 kg (330 lb). The limb bones are massively built, though the limbs bones towards the ends (distal parts) of the limbs like the tibia are particularly short, suggesting an adaption for dismembering and/or carrying carcasses. The shortening of the distal limb bones results in P. brevirostris not being much taller than modern hyenas despite being considerably larger. The skull is large and has a well developed sagittal crest, indicating well developed and large temporal muscles in life. The teeth, particularly the large premolars, and the powerfully built mandible show a strong adaption to bone cracking. The fourth premolars and first molars of P. brevirostris had zigzag Hunter-Schreger bands in their enamel, indicating they were very well adapted for durophagy.

== Behaviour and ecology ==
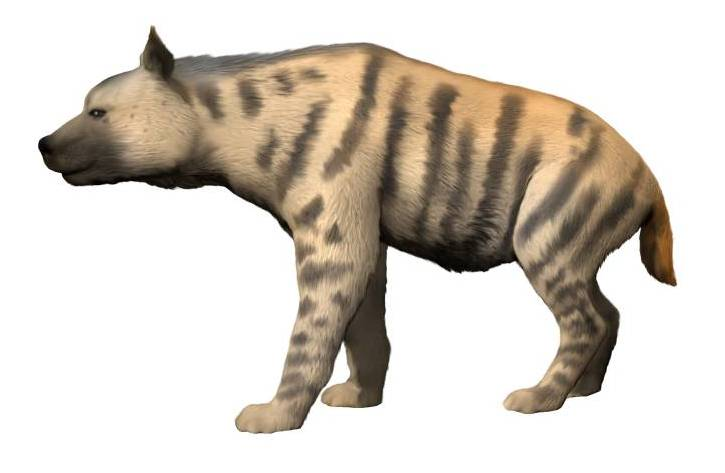
Reconstruction

It has been suggested that Pachycrocuta lived in packs, similar to living spotted hyenas. A cache of very comprehensive bone material was unearthed at the famous Zhoukoudian cave site in Northern China, which probably represents the remains of animals using these caves as lairs for many millennia. At the western end of their former range, at Venta Micena in southeastern Spain, a huge assemblage of Pleistocene fossils also represents a den. Yet another example exists in the Pabbi Hills of Pakistan, where remains of animals scavenged or killed by Pachycrocuta were accumulated. The morphology of its limbs suggests that it was less adapted to running than living spotted hyenas. Pachycrocuta is often suggested to have been a kleptoparasitic scavenger, using its imposing size to force other predators, such as the sabertooth cats Homotherium and Megantereon, as well as the wild dog Xenocyon lycaonoides off of carcasses. However, other authors have argued that while P. brevirostris likely engaged in kleptoparasitism, it was likely equally capable of hunting medium-large sized prey in packs, similar to living spotted hyenas. Its powerfully built limbs would likely have been effective in subduing prey. P. brevirostris is known from fossil evidence found at Tsiotra Vryssi in Greece to have preferentially consumed certain bones depending on their nutrient value.

Species preyed upon and/or scavenged by Pachycrocuta during the Early Pleistocene in Europe include the mammoth species Mammuthus meridionalis, equines (likely including Equus altidens), rhinoceroses, deer (likely including Praemegaceros) and bovids (likely including bison). At the site of Cueva Victoria in southeast Spain, evidence for the consumption of monk seals (Monachus), has also been found.

Eggs found in coprolites (fossilised feces) from Crimea indicate that Pachycrocuta brevirostris harboured a number of parasites, including flukes, tapeworms of the genus Taenia and parasitic nematodes of the genera Toxocara and Capillaria.

== Relationship with humans ==
P. brevirostris likely competed with early representatives of Homo (archaic humans) in Early Pleistocene Europe like Homo antecessor for carrion, with one mammoth carcass from the Fuente Nueva-3 site in Spain showing evidence of having been consumed by both archaic humans and Pachycrocuta. A skull of Homo erectus georgicus from the Dmanisi Paleolithic site, Georgia in the Caucasus displays bite marks that may be attributable to Pachycrocuta. Remains of "Peking Man" (an East Asian form of Homo erectus) in the Zhoukoudian cave site display evidence of having been consumed by Pachycrocuta which includes distinctive fracturing of the skull, likely the result of biting on the facial region likely to expose the brain, as well as bones displaying signs of having been swallowed and subject to erosion by stomach acid. It is unclear whether this consumption indicates predation or scavenging.

== Evolution and extinction ==
=== Evolution ===
The oldest fossils usually considered to belong to the genus are known from the Pliocene of East Africa, the species P. bellax, known from the Early Pleistocene of South Africa, falls within the morphological variation of P. brevirostris, though its geographical separation from the that species renders its validity equivocal. It has been proposed that P. brevirostris ultimately evolved in Asia from Pliocrocuta perrieri, which is only distinguishable from P. brevirostris by the presence of a metaconid on the first molar. The earliest fossils of P. brevirostris in Europe date to around 1.8-2 million years ago, with the earliest fossils in East Asia probably being slightly older. The arrival of Pachycrocuta in Europe was associated with a faunal turnover event called the "Pachycrocuta event", coinciding with considerable extinctions among the herbivore and carnivore guild and their replacement by new arrivals from elsewhere, coinciding with the onset of cold conditions of the Eburonian glaciation. During its existence in Europe, Pachycrocuta brevirostris represented the only species of hyena present in the region, and largest carnivore alongside the lion-sized sabertooth Homotherium.

=== Extinction ===
P. brevirostris became extinct in Europe around 800,000 years ago, around the time of the arrival of spotted hyenas (Crocuta crocuta) to Europe, with some authors suggesting spotted hyenas may have outcompeted Pachycrocuta due to the spotted hyena having better adaptations for osteophagy and lived in larger groups. However, this has been questioned by recent analysis as there is no evidence of temporal overlap between the two species. Instead, the likely cause of its extinction in Europe was the result of a major faunal turnover event at the Early-Middle Pleistocene (Villafranchian-Galerian) transition in which many European megafauna species became extinct, likely as a result of a more unstable climate as a consequence to changes in the length of glacial cycles. The extinction of the sabertooth cat Megantereon, whose kills Pachycrocuta likely scavenged, has also suggested by some authors as a factor. Pachycrocuta became extinct in Europe as part The latest remains from East Asia are from the Zhoukoudian site, dating to around 500,000 years ago, and the species may have persisted later elsewhere in Asia.

== See also ==
- Cave hyena (Crocuta crocuta spelaea), an extinct subspecies of spotted hyena alternatively considered a distinct species native to Eurasia during the Pleistocene.
- Dinocrocuta, an extinct genus of giant hyena-like carnivore known from the late Miocene.
