= Charles Depéret =

French geologist and paleontologist

- Born: 25 June 1854; Perpignan, France
- Died: 18 May 1929 (aged 74); Lyon, France
- Scientific career
- Fields: Geology; Paleontology
- Institutions: Aix-Marseille University; University of Lyon

Charles Jean Julien Depéret (25 June 1854 – 18 May 1929) was a French geologist and paleontologist. He was a member of the French Academy of Sciences, the Société géologique de France and dean of the Science faculty of Lyon.

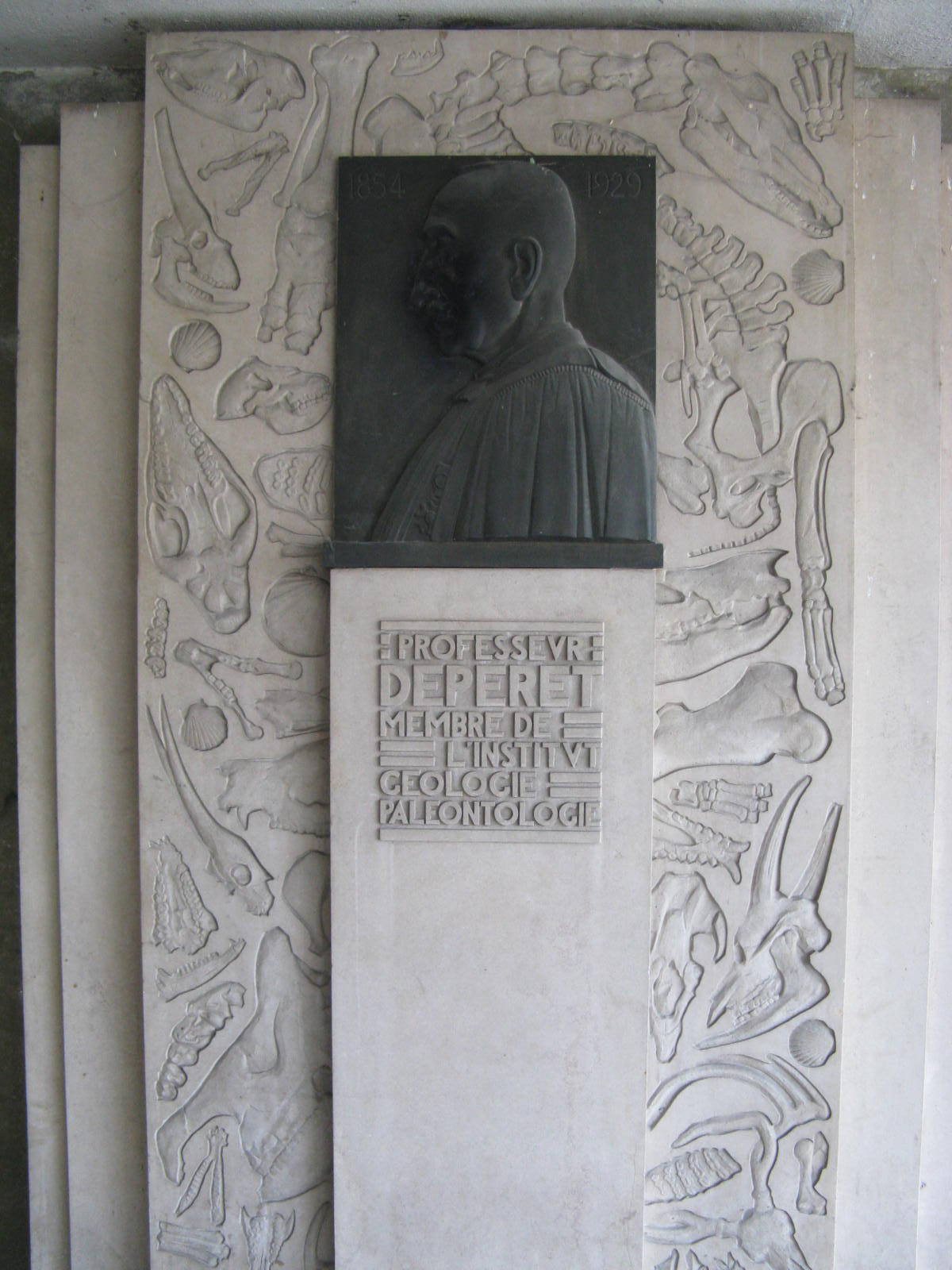
Stèle on the La Doua campus in Villeurbanne in honor of Charles Depéret.

Charles Depéret was born in Perpignan. He started his career as a military doctor from 1877 to 1888. Initially posted in Algeria, he was later active in Sathonay. In 1888, he became lecturer at Aix-Marseille University, and in 1889 he became professor of geology at the University of Lyon. He died in Lyon.

In 1892 he introduced the Burdigalian Stage (Lower Miocene) based on stratigraphic units found near Bordeaux and in the Rhône Valley. He was an advocate of the controversial prehistoric artifacts findings of Glozel.

Along with Edward Drinker Cope, who appears not to have written on this topic, his name is associated with the so-called "Cope-Depéret rule", a law which asserts that in population lineages, body size tends to increase over evolutionary time. In his book Les transformations du monde animal, he denied that any instance of reduction in body size in evolution had been documented. For instance, he argued (chapter XIX of the book) that the small extinct elephants of Mediterranean islands (like "Elephas melitensis", now called Palaeoloxodon melitensis) were not dwarfed elephants but rather, descendants of ancient elephants that had always retained a small body size, a hypothesis that has been refuted by subsequent research. Some authors have thus suggested to call this Depéret's rule.

== Taxa described by Depéret ==
- Amphirhagatherium (1908).
- Carcharodontosaurus saharicus (with Justin Savornin, 1925).
- Gazella borbonica (1884).
- Megalosaurus crenatissimus, now referred to as Majungasaurus crenatissimus, (1896).
- Protragocerus, (1887).
- Pseudosinopa, synonym Cynohyaenodon, (1917).

== Selected works ==
In 1909 his book Les transformations du monde animal (1907) was translated into English and published with the title "The transformations of the animal world". The following list contains a few of his other noted writings:

- Description géologique du bassin tertiaire du Roussillon, 1885 – Description of the tertiary geological basin in Roussillon.
- Les animaux pliocènes du Roussillon, 1890 – Pliocene animals of Roussillon.
- La faune de mammifères miocènes de la Grive-Saint-Alban (Isère) et de quelques autres localités du bassin du Rhone : documents nouveaux et revision générale, 1892 – On Miocene vertebrates of Grive-Saint-Alban (Isère) and some other localities of the Rhône basin.
- Note sur les dinosauriens sauropodes & théropodes du Crétacé supérieur de Madagascar, 1896 – Note on the sauropod and theropod dinosaurs from the Upper Cretaceous of Madagascar.
- Monographie des pectinidés néogènes de l'Europe et des régions voisines, 1902 – Monograph on Neogene pectinids of Europe and neighboring regions.
- Monographie de la faune de mammifères fossiles du Ludien inférieur d'Euzet-les-Bains (Gard), 1917 – Monograph on fossil mammal fauna of the lower Ludian at Euzet-les-Bains, (Gard).

== Legasy ==
Deperetella, an extinct perissodactyl, is named after Depéret.

== See also ==
- Burdigalian
- Cope-Depéret rule
- Majungasaurus
