= Untermassfeld fossil site =

Palaeontological site in Untermaßfeld, Germany

The Untermaßfeld fossil site is a palaeontological site in Untermaßfeld, Germany. Excavated continuously since its discovery in 1978, it has produced many fossils dating to the late Early Pleistocene or Epivillafranchian geologic period, approximately 1.2 – 0.9 million years before present (BP). Claims that hominins were also present at the site have sparked a major controversy.

== Hominin controversy ==
In a series of papers published between 2013 and 2017, Günter Landeck and Joan Garcia Garriga claimed to have found evidence of a hominin presence at the site in the form of stone tools and butchery marks on bones. If verified, this would be the earliest known occupation of northern Europe by humans, as previous evidence had indicated that Europe was only sporadically occupied, at southerly latitudes, before 500,000 BP. However, these findings have sparked a major controversy. Questions were immediately asked about the provenance of the material, since neither Landeck nor Garcia Garriga had any connection to the Untermassfeld project and had never worked on the excavations at the site.

Further doubts were raised in October 2017, in the preprint of a paper later published in the Journal of Paleolithic Archaeology, authored by several palaeontologists and Palaeolithic archaeologists, including Wil Roebroeks and Ralf-Dietrich Kahlke, the director of the Untermassfeld excavations. The authors reported that they were unable to locate the collections Landeck and Garcia Garriga claim to have based their analysis on, even after contacting them. They alleged that the description of some of the bones discussed in Landeck and Garcia Garriga's papers matched those in a package anonymously delivered to a local natural history museum; and that two bones matched specific pieces that were reported stolen from the site in 2009 and 2012. Based on a reanalysis of the material in the anonymous package and the details provided in their papers, they also argued that Landeck and Garcia Garriga had misidentified both the stone tools and the butchery marks. They concluded that there was no evidence of a hominin presence at Untermassfeld.

Garcia Garriga has "strenuously denied" the allegations, stating that he had no connection to the material and had only helped write up Landeck's analysis. Landeck claimed that the material was shown to him by two unnamed private collectors who had found it during "rescue activities" near—but not in—the Untermassfeld site. Both told Nature that they had "nothing to do with a stolen bone" and were writing a detailed response to the allegations.
