= Monte León National Park =

National park in Argentina

- Parque Nacional Monte León
- IUCN category II (national park)
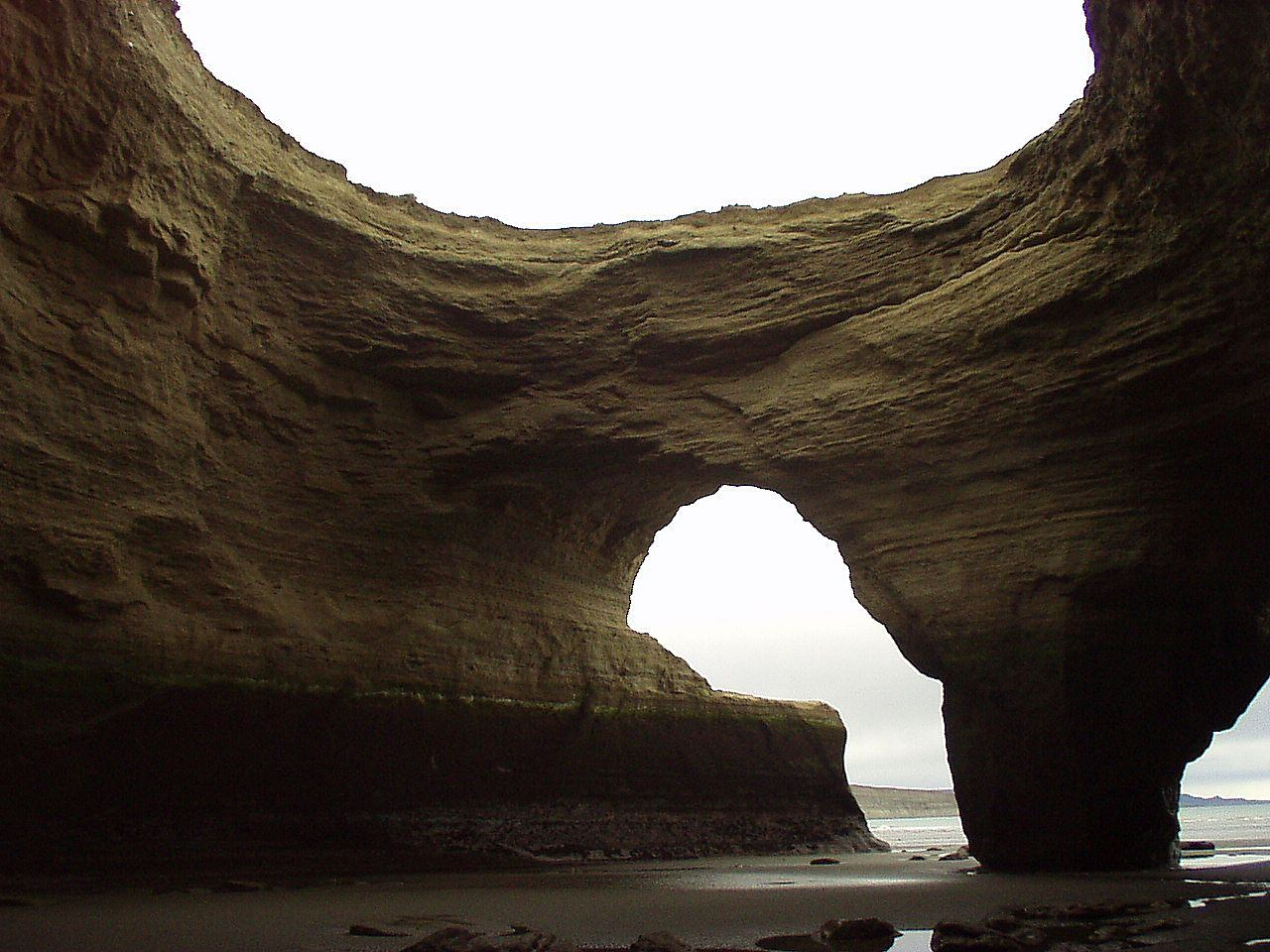
- Natural arches on the park's beach

- Location within Argentina
- Location: Santa Cruz Province, Argentina
- Nearest city: Puerto Santa Cruz
- Coordinates: 50°14′S 69°00′W
- Area: 62,168 ha (621.68 km^{2}; 240.03 sq mi)
- Established: October 20, 2004
- Governing body: Argentine National Parks Administration

Monte León National Park (Spanish: Parque Nacional Monte León) is a federal protected area in Santa Cruz Province, Argentina. Established on 20 October 2004, it houses a representative sample of the steppe and Patagonian coast biodiversity in good state of conservation, as well as several paleontological sites of high value. It runs along 36 km (22 mi) of the southern Argentine Sea coastline.

== History ==
About 10,000–13,000 years ago, hunter-gatherer groups took advantage of the area's varied coastal environment, full of food resources. The Tehuelche people, descendants of the first settlers, expanded land use, developing a greater exchange with other, farther away groups. The arrival of the first European settlers triggered major changes in the original populations: the gradual increase of product exchange dependency and loss of territory caused migrations towards the west of the province and the incorporation of the original settlers into rural tasks.

In early 1876, during the presidency of Nicolás Avellaneda and because of increasing tension regarding neighboring Chile's expansion attempts over Argentine Patagonia, Buenos Aires started issuing authorizations for the exploitation of guano in the zone 35 km (22 mi) south of the Santa Cruz River, where 17 years earlier the Argentine commander Luis Piedrabuena had established an outpost. In April the governor of Punta Arenas, Diego Dublé Almeyda, sent the gunboat Magallanes with orders of sinking any Argentine vessels in the area. The French boat Jeanne-Amelie, authorized by Avellaneda's administration, was boarded and its crew imprisoned by the Chilean forces, an incident that worsened the bilateral relationship. Two years later Chile once again seized a vessel in Monte León: this time it was the United States' ship Devonshire, and the action put both countries at the verge of war.

Francisco P. Moreno, naturalist and creator of the Argentine National Park System, and the paleontologist Carlos Ameghino explored the area in the late 19th century. The Italian missionary Alberto María De Agostini also visited it in the early 20th century.

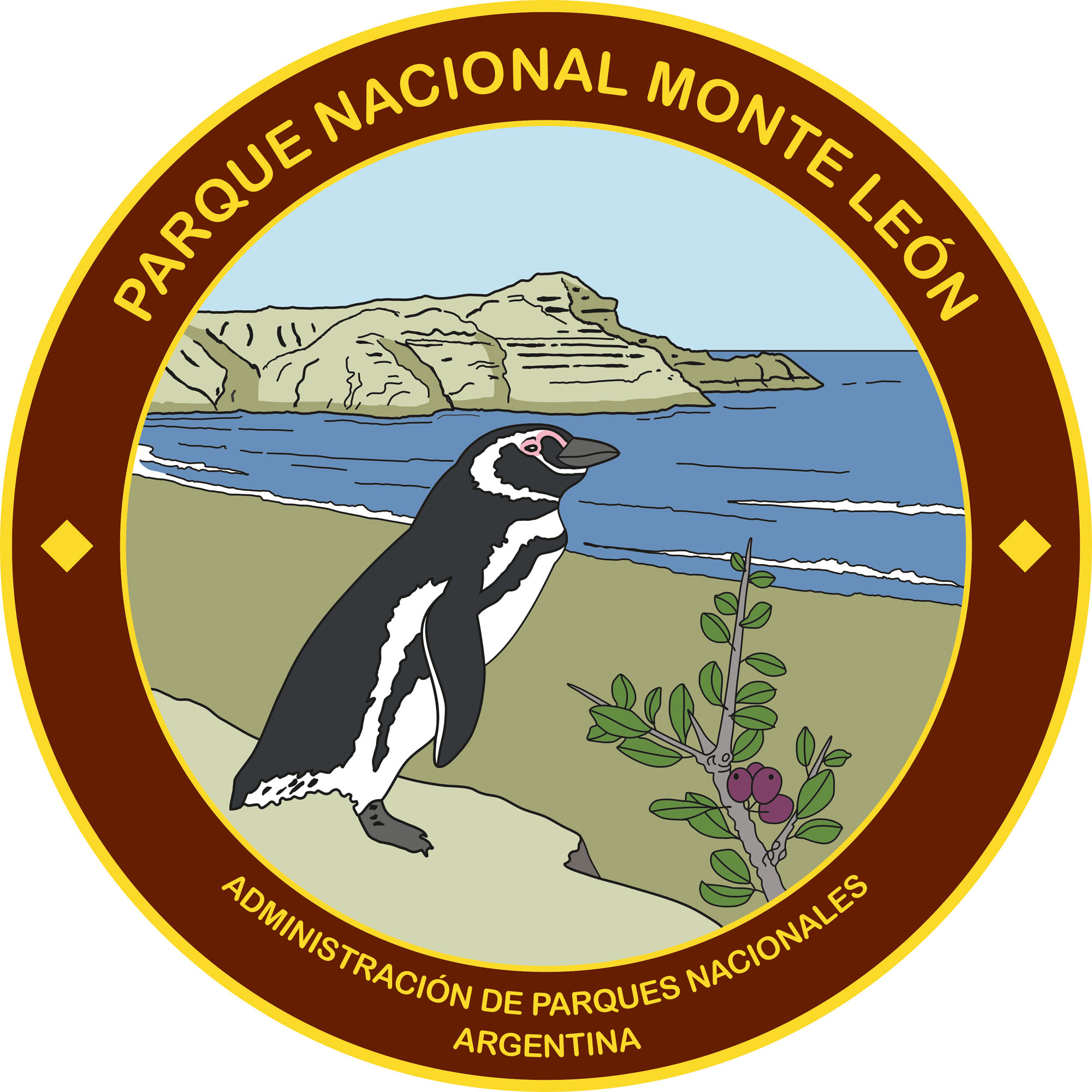
Park logo with Magellanic penguin

The Estancia Monte León belonged to the Southern Patagonia Sheep Farming Company Limited, which exploited it as a sheep farm. It was sold in 1920 to the Braun family, who continued this business until 2006. The extraction of guano was profitable until 1930.

In 1996 Monte León was proposed to be included in the National Park System of Argentina. Francisco Erize, former director of the Argentine National Parks Administration, recommended the project to Douglas Tompkins, a billionaire businessman, environmentalist, and founder of Tompkins Conservation, a conservationist NGO.

In 2000, through the NGO Conservación Patagónica, founded and directed by Kristine Tompkins, the farm land was acquired and transferred by land trust to Fundación Vida Silvestre Argentina, demanding it to be donated to the National Parks National Administration, a process finished in 2002. Finally, on 20 October 2004 the law creating the new national park was sanctioned by Congress, making Monte León the first continental marine park of Argentina.

== Description ==
Monte León consists of high sandstone cliffs, rock formations, islands, wide beaches interrupted by narrow bays, and sandbars that are uncovered in low tide. The park's coastal sector represents about 1% of the Argentine mainland shoreline.

Monte León National Park scenery

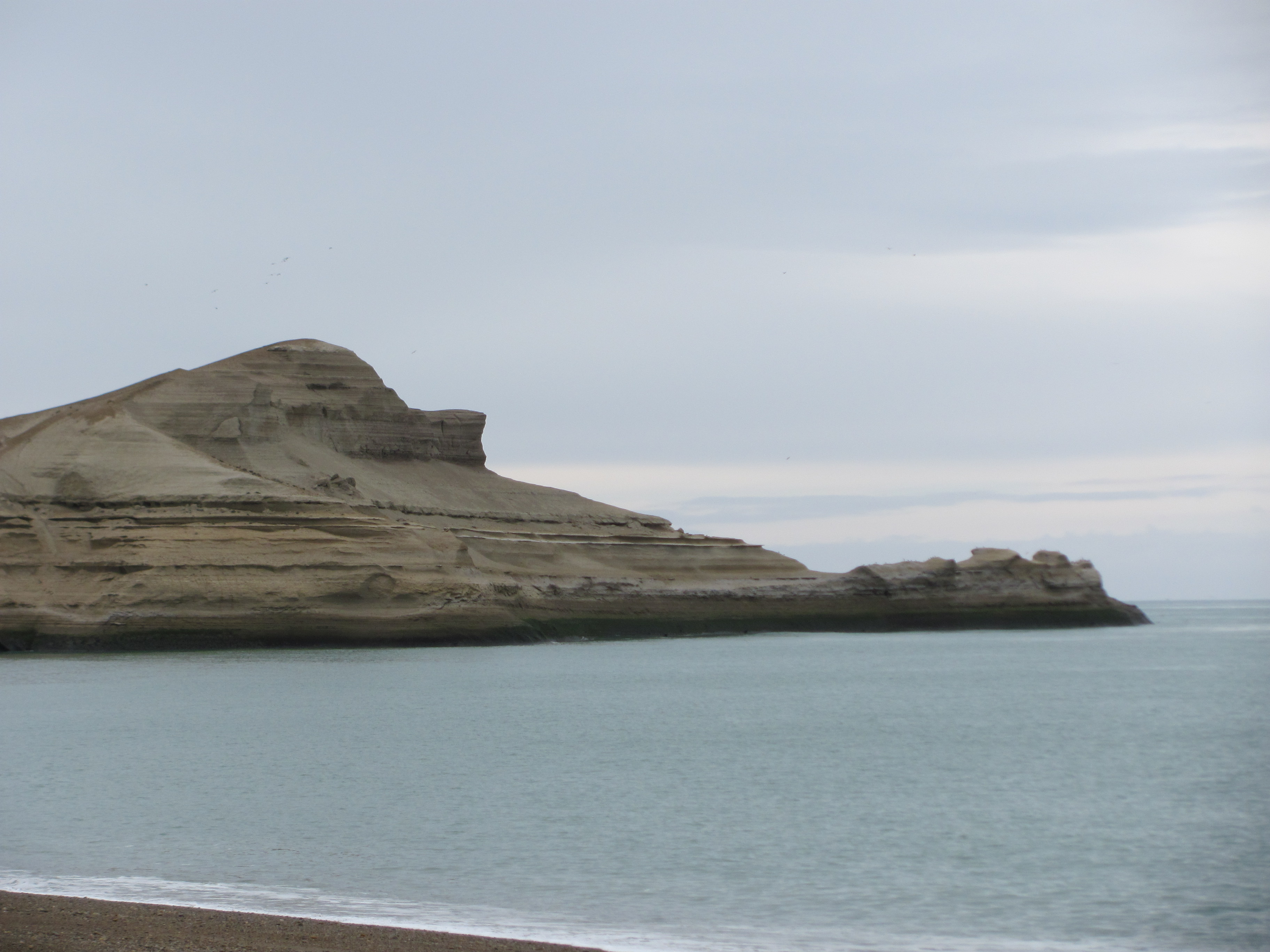
Monte Cabeza de León ("Lion Head Mount"), the rock formation the park is named for

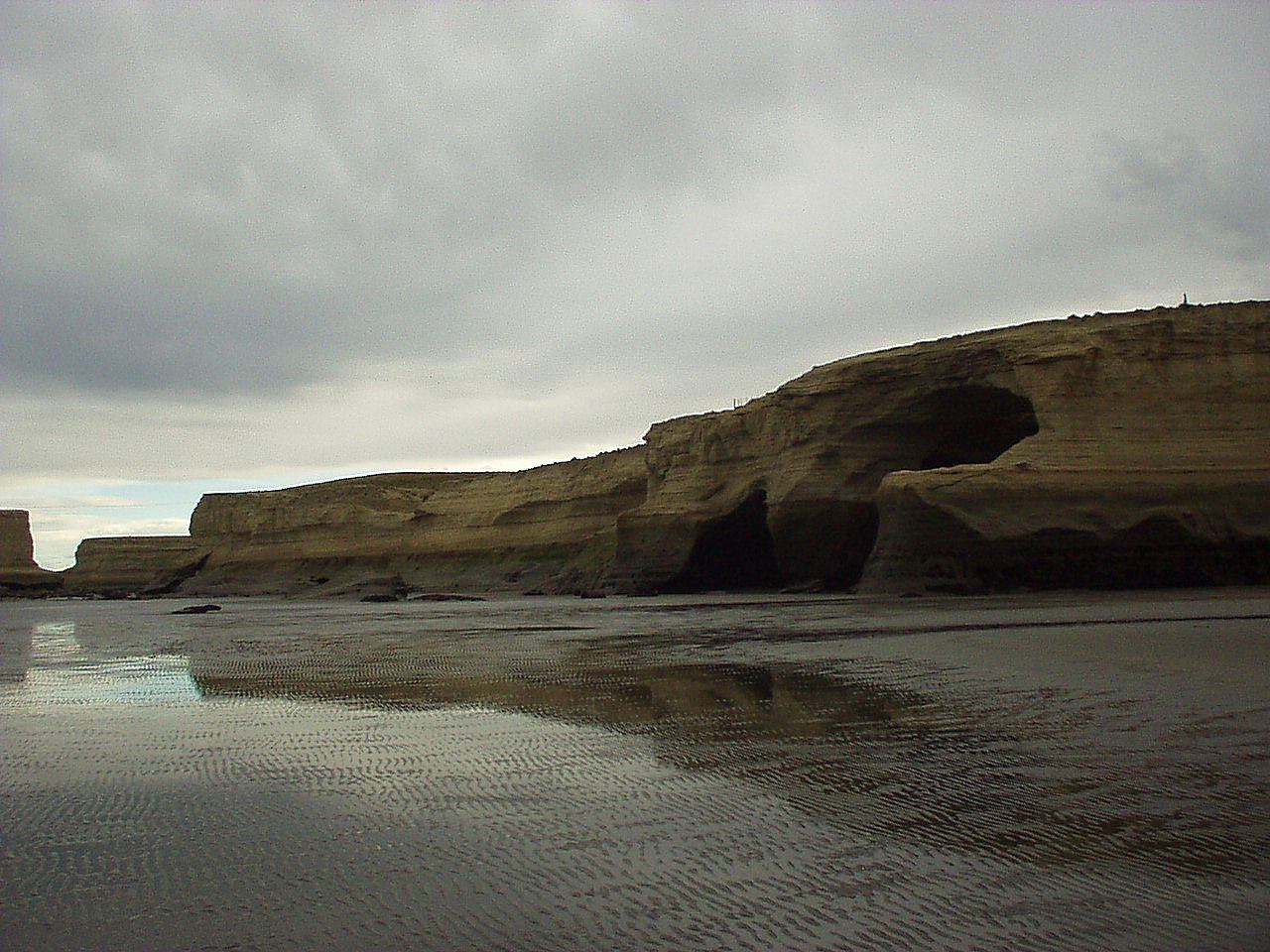
Sandstone cliffs over the park's beach

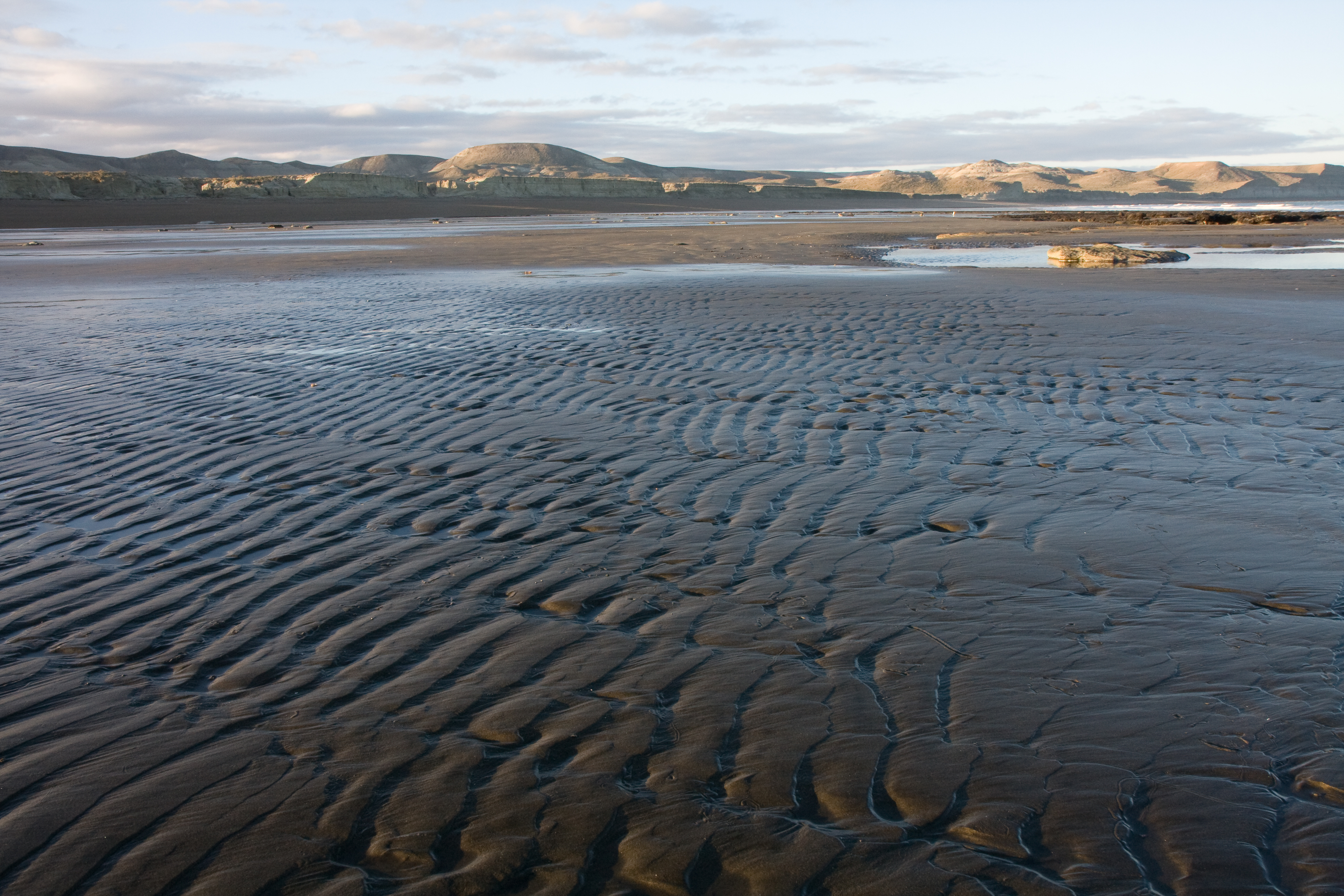
Beach in low tide

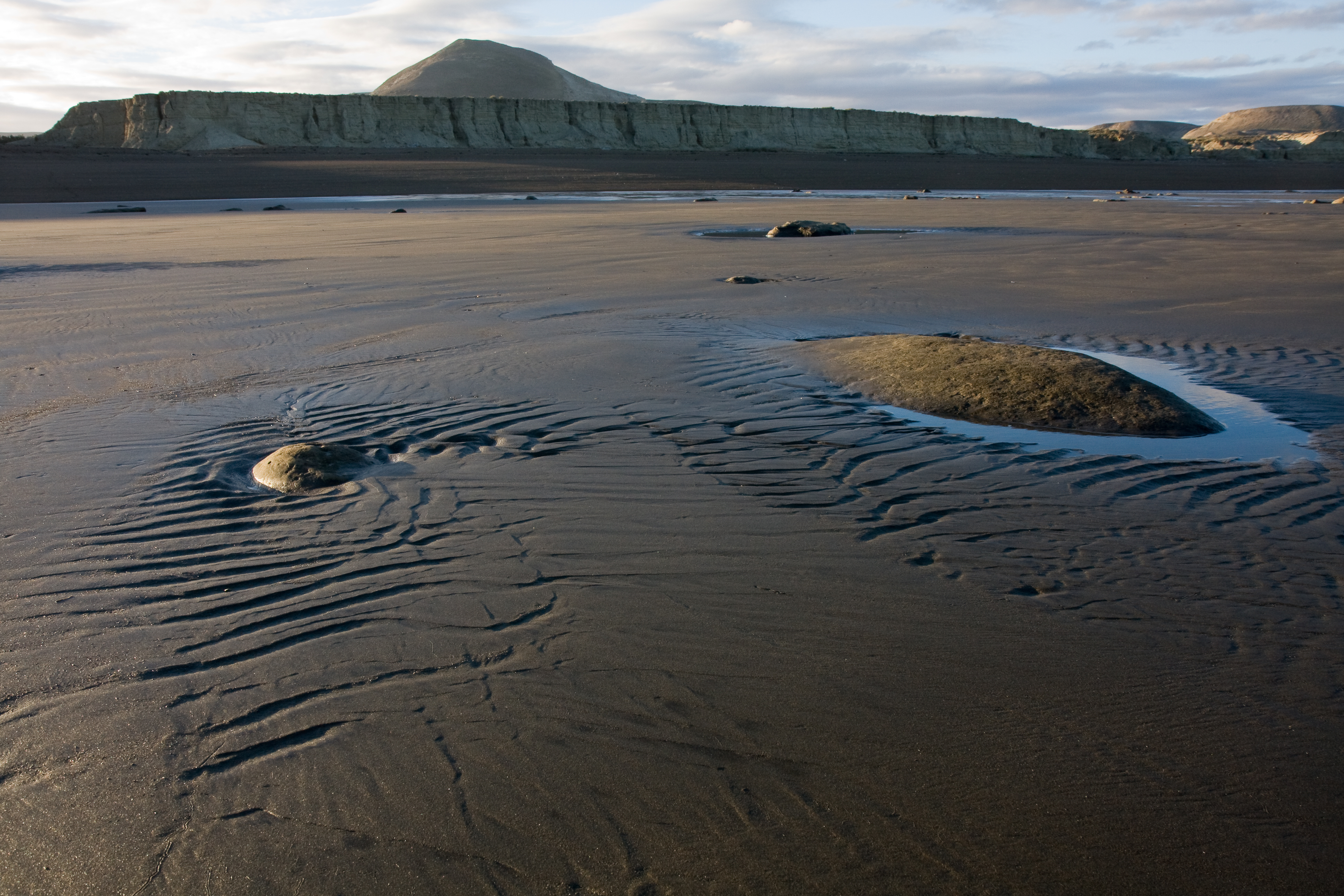
Beach in low tide

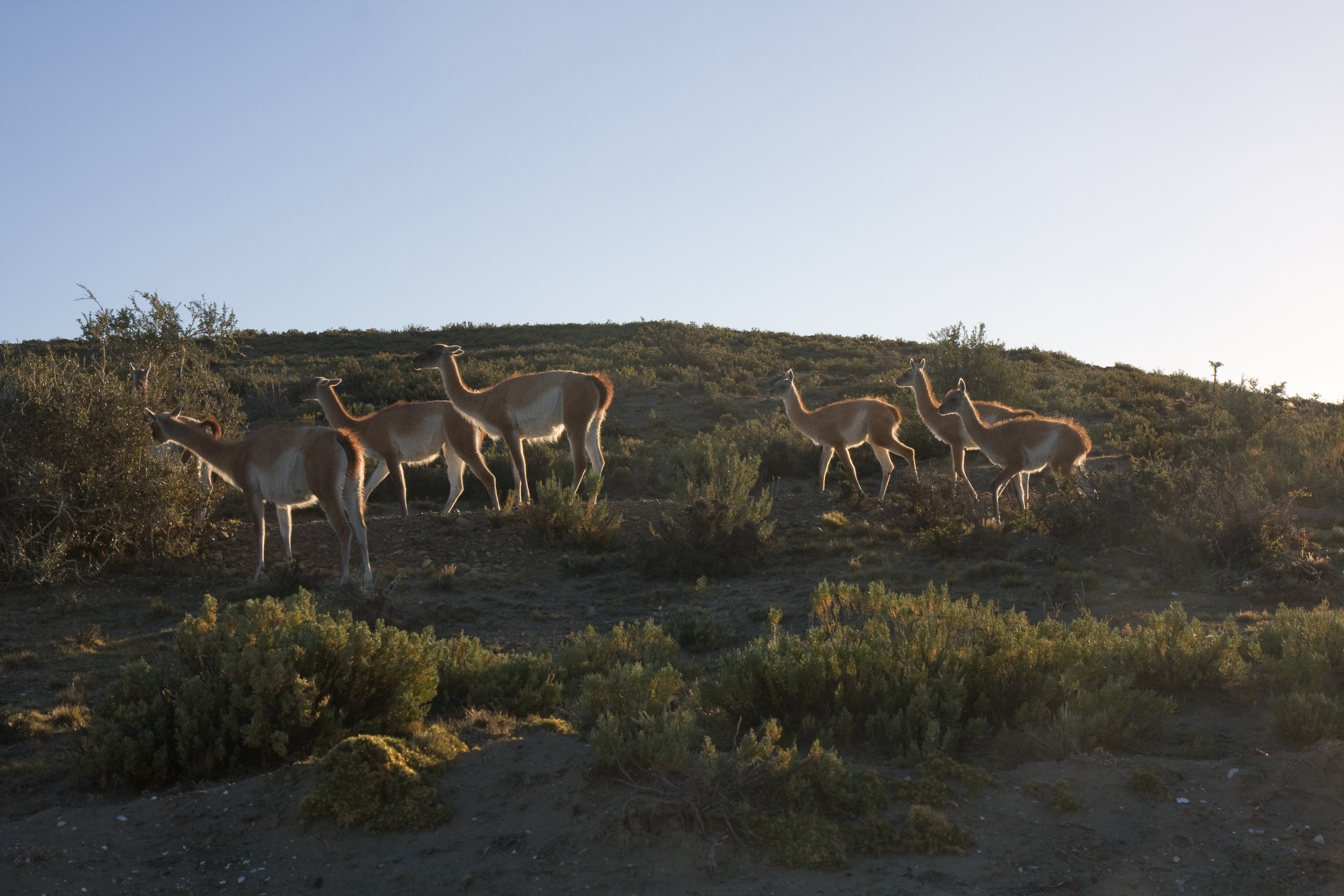
A herd of guanacos in the neighboring grasslands

== Climate ==
The park has a cold arid or semi-arid climate with a mean annual temperature of 6.8 °C (44.2 °F). Temperatures during the winter months can fall below 0 °C (32.0 °F) while they can exceed 30 °C (86.0 °F) during summer. The park averages 250 mm (9.8 in) of rainfall per year, which is concentrated in fall and winter. Average annual wind speeds range between 15 and 20 km/h (9.3 and 12.4 mph), although the park can experience gusts up to 100 km/h (62 mph).

== Biodiversity ==
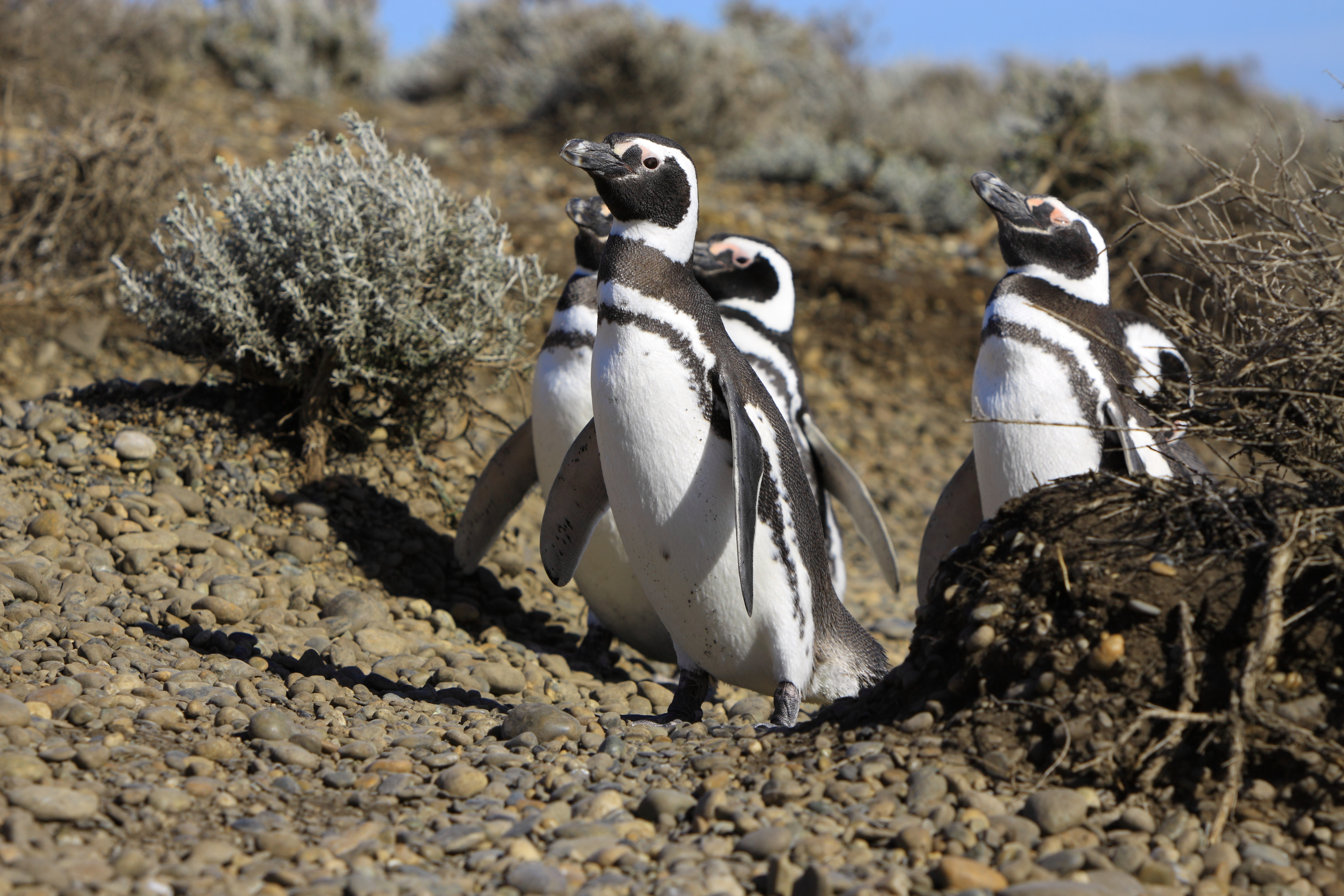
The park is home to large colonies of Magellanic penguins.

The Patagonian steppe, while barren at first glance, is inhabited by a considerable variety of plants. In 1880, Carlos Spegazzini, the founder of botany in Argentina, identified several hitherto unknown grass species when researching the area as part of a scientific expedition financed by Italy.

Aboriginal people used calafate resin as a sort of chewing gum, a custom that chroniclers linked to the good health and cleanliness of their dentures. The wild thyme is widely used in the local cuisine. Several other plant species found in the park also have medicinal uses. As is usual for desert climates, harsh winters are often followed by spectacular blooms of colorful flowers.

Monte León is also home to about twenty species of coastal and marine birds: several varieties of penguins (including the Magellanic penguin, of which the park holds Argentina's fourth-largest colony, with about 60,000 individuals), three species of cormorants (the red-legged cormorant, the rock shag and the imperial shag), and large, flightless birds known as ñandús (rheas).

Very large populations of fish roam the cold sea waters. The park is also home to several large mammals, including sea lions (forming populous colonies), southern right whales, pumas and roaming herds of guanacos. The park is the only place in the world where pumas feed on penguins.
