= Conservación Patagónica =

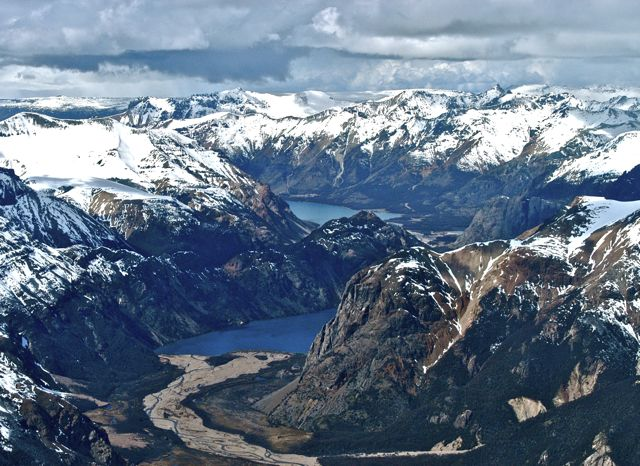
- Patagonia National Park
- Formation: 2000
- Purpose: To protect and restore Patagonia's wildland ecosystems, biodiversity, and healthy communities through creating national parks
- President: Kristine Tompkins
- Website: www.conservacionpatagonica.org

Conservación Patagónica was a conservation group with a mission "to create national parks in Patagonia that save and restore wildlands and wildlife, inspire care for the natural world, and generate healthy economic opportunities for local communities." Founded in 2000 by Kristine Tompkins, former CEO of Patagonia, Inc, Conservación Patagónica first focused on the creation of Monte León National Park in Argentina, the country's first coastal national park. The group played a central role in securing the funds for the purchase of Estancia Monte Leon and in creating long-term management plans for the new national park. As of December 31, 2018 Conservación Patagónica has merged into Tompkins Conservation.

== Creating Patagonia National Park ==
In 2004, Conservación Patagónica (CP) launched its second project, the creation of Patagonia National Park in Chile's Aysen Region. The group purchased Estancia Valle Chacabuco, a 72,000-hectare (178,000-acre) sheep ranch in the Chacabuco Valley, which lies between two existing Chilean National Reserves, Jeinimeni and Tamango. The conservation plan calls for the donation of CP's privately acquired land to the Chilean parks administration, which, in combination with Jeinimeni and Tamango National Reserves, will form one new national park of 260,000 hectares (650,000 acres). As of 2011, the park is well over halfway complete.

The Patagonia National Park Project consists of four major program areas: buying land, restoring biodiversity, building public access, and engaging communities.

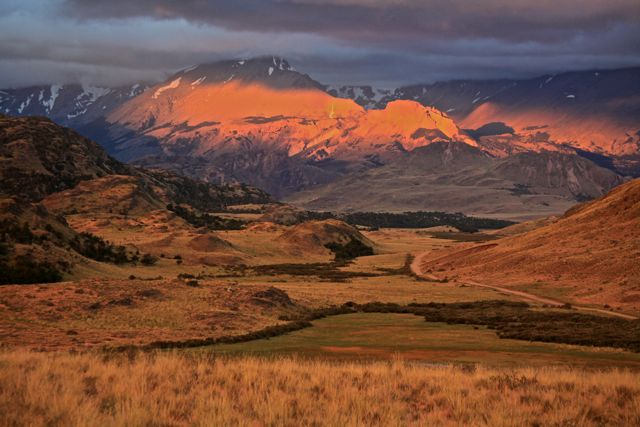
The heart of the future park: the Chacabuco Valley

== Buying Land ==
The bulk of the land acquisition for the Patagonia National Park project occurred in 2004 with the purchase of the 70,000-hectare (173,000-acre) Estancia Valle Chacabuco, formerly one of Chile's largest sheep ranches, and a long-time conservation priority for the Chilean parks service due to its unique array of native ecosystems. Since 2004, the organization has been purchasing smaller holdings from willing sellers in the Chacabuco Valley, with the goal of creating a continuous reserve to meet the edges of the nearbyJeinimeni and Tamango National Reserves.

== Restoring Biodiversity ==
The Chacabuco Valley, heart of the future Patagonia National Park, was for generations a vast sheep and cattle ranch, with almost 25,000 animals being raised on the land in a single year. The native grasslands were degraded by years of intense livestock grazing, leading to patchy desertification of the soils, and to the decline of wildlife populations that are native to the grasslands. Since purchasing the Estancia in 2004, CP has been working to remove fencing and reseed former pastures with native grasses, opening up the land to the return of native species such as the guanaco, and the endangered huemul deer. Recovery of the huemul is a top priority for the organization, which is conducting projects to monitor and protect the park's population of 100-200 animals, one of the largest known surviving populations on earth.

- Ecosystem Restoration:

Patagonia has suffered its share of ecological abuse: intensive sheep ranching on sandy, arid soils has resulted in widespread desertification. In the transition from sheep ranch to national park, Conservación Patagónica aims to reverse these damages, restore productive habitat, and create a model of ecosystem restoration for Patagonia. The grasslands recovery program, launched in 2004, began with removing almost all livestock. Conservación Patagónica's volunteer program performs the bulk of the work of ecosystem restoration. As of 2011, they have removed over half of the 640 kilometres (400 mi) of habitat-fragmenting ranch fencing. Volunteers also collect seeds from native coiron grasses, which professional ecosystem restoration workers use to reseed heavily damaged areas.

- Wildlife Recovery:

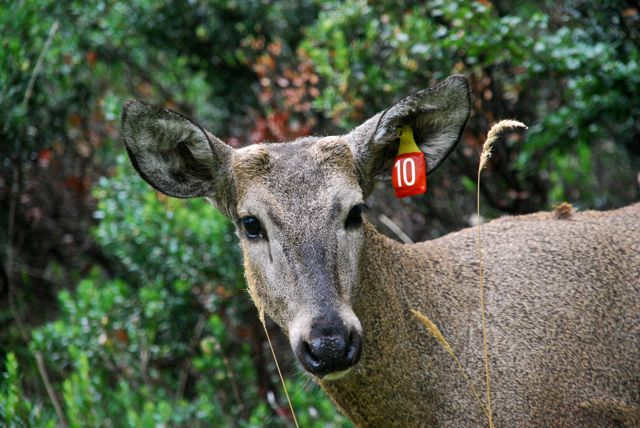
Endangered huemul deer, collared as part of recovery program

Conservación Patagónica's large-scale ecosystem restoration work serves as the foundation for targeted species-specific programs, such as the effort to monitor and protect the endangered and emblematic huemul deer. As wildness returns to this vast area, the populations of keystone species are finding a new equilibrium. With livestock gone, grasslands are producing more and better quality food for a range of herbivores, which have access to prime habitat and can roam freely without fences. Wildlife recovery programs take this ecosystem-level transition as the jumping-off point for initiatives to protect keystone species. The huemul deer represents the top priority for the Patagonia National Park project: habitat loss, disease transmitted from livestock, hunting, and predation by domestic dogs have diminished its population to 1,500 individuals left on Earth. Tracking pumas with GPS collars uncovers new information about their predation patterns, home ranges, and movements—critical data given their proximity to the huemul deer population. Simultaneously, Conservación Patagónica is developing strategies, such as livestock guardian dogs, to mitigate predator-livestock conflicts.

== Building Public Access ==
One of CP's major focuses at the Patagonia National Park project is constructing durable, accessible public access infrastructure in order to provide visitors with a comfortable, engaging experience at the park. They are building a park headquarters to include overnight accommodations, a restaurant, and a museum and visitor center. They are also constructing trails and campgrounds to allow visitors to access the wilderness areas of the park, and to reach the neighboring reserves.

- Trails and Campgrounds:

Through providing recreational opportunities, the park will bolster eco-tourism in the region, supporting local businesses and communities while inspiring a deeper respect for nature in park visitors. The network of trails and campgrounds under construction will provide access to different areas and ecosystems within the future park and will connect to existing trails in the adjacent National Reserves. Trails and hiking circuits maximize visitor engagement with the landscape while minimizing ecological impacts. In 2010, construction began of three trail systems and two campgrounds. The goal is to prepare the park for a pre-opening to the general public in late 2011.

- Main Park Headquarters:

The park headquarters—the central area where visitors come to eat, sleep, gather, and learn, where employees live and train, and where the surrounding community gathers—are intended to be the center of the future Patagonia National Park. The architecture is designed to convey the cultural value of nature. Historic Patagonian buildings provide a vernacular architectural vocabulary tied to the region's history. These buildings are designed to be durable, solid, and well-insulated to require minimal upkeep, and use local materials such as stone quarried on site and recycled wood. In addition, a renewable energy system, composed of solar, wind, and mini-hydro generation facilities, is intended to make the park one of the first energy-independent parks and minimize its carbon footprint.

== Engaging Communities ==
From the start of the project, CP has been developing collaborations with neighboring communities in order expand local visits to the park, to include area residents in employment opportunities, and to facilitate the development of a successful eco-tourism economy to the region as the park grows. Through engaging children and other members of the local community, the park will inspire awareness and dedication to conservation. Conservación Patagónica has offered jobs to all former gauchos and developed programs to retrain them as park rangers and conservation workers. A school outreach program brings local children into the park to learn about endangered species such as the huemul deer, and the potential community benefits of conservation. Conservación Patagónica host the annual Huemul Festival and hike, in which our neighbors hike through the Tamango Reserve into Valle Chacabuco. Huemul scholarships have allowed more than fifty students to continue their studies.

== Conservación Patagónica in the media ==
The 2010 film 180 Degrees South: Conquerors of the Useless profiled Conservación Patagónica and its work to protect and restore land in Patagonia. Conservación Patagónica also keeps a press page updated with the archives of press related to the organization.

== See also ==
- Kristine Tompkins
- Douglas Tompkins
- Monte Leon National Park
- Pumalin Park
