= International Conservation Caucus Foundation =

Non-partisan 501(c)(3) educational foundation

- Formation: 2006
- Type: Educational Foundation
- Headquarters: Washington, D.C., United States
- Founder: David Barron
- President: John Gantt
- Website: www.iccfoundation.us

International Conservation Caucus Foundation (ICCF) is a non-partisan 501(c)(3) educational foundation based in Washington, D.C. that functions as the U.S. chapter of The ICCF Group. ICCF's stated mission is "to advance U.S. leadership in international conservation through public and private partnerships and to develop the next generation of conservation leaders in the U.S. Congress."

ICCF works with bipartisan leadership of conservation-focused caucuses to educate policymakers on issues that increase the effectiveness of government support for international conservation projects. The organization provides balanced information to Members of Congress through briefings and organizes educational programs by international conservation leaders in the corporate, government, and NGO communities.

== Programs ==
=== U.S. Congressional Briefing Series ===
ICCF hosts educational programs with expert presenters on topics coordinated by conservationists' recommendations and concerns. Briefings focus on the direct connection between support of intelligent management of natural resources globally and benefits to U.S. national and economic security. Focal topic areas include oceans, forestry, and agriculture.

=== Caucus Support ===
ICCF supports certain bipartisan and bicameral caucuses in the U.S. legislature. As of the 118th Congress, these include:

- U.S. Congressional International Conservation Caucus (ICC)
- the Congressional Oceans Caucus (OC)
- the U.S. Senate Climate Solutions Caucus (SCSC)

=== Awards ===
ICCF offers four major awards:

- The ICCF Teddy Roosevelt® International Conservation Award is presented to government leaders who demonstrate innovative leadership in conservation policy. Notable recipients have included: Rob Portman, Tony Blair, Jens Stoltenberg, Gloria Macapagal Arroyo, Prince Albert II of Monaco, Russell Train, the Great Green Wall Initiative, H.E. Lt. General Seretse Khama Ian Khama, King Charles III, and Felipe Calderón.
- ICCF Conservation Leadership in Business Award, which recognizes leaders who use business to inspire solutions to conservation challenges. Notable recipients have included: DuPont, Yvon Chouinard, National Geographic Society, Unilever, and Bumble Bee Foods.
- ICCF's "Good Steward" Award" is presented to individuals who have demonstrated outstanding leadership in conservation. Notable recipients have included: Ed Norton, Kris and Doug Tompkins, Harrison Ford, Rob Walton, and Bo Derek.
- The ICCF Lifetime Achievement Award recognizes individuals who have demonstrated a lifelong commitment to environmental preservation and restoration. Notable recipients have included: Stewart Udall and Magalen O. "Maggie" Bryant.

=== The ICCF Group ===
ICCF launched the Conservation Council of Nations (CCN), which does business as The ICCF Group, in May 2011 as a separate 501(c)(3) entity to build an international network of conservation-minded public and private sector leaders to foster new conservation caucuses modeled after ICC.

The ICCF Group's mission is "To Advance Conservation Governance by Building Political Will, Providing On-the-Ground Solutions," with a vision for "A World Where People and Nature Sustain and Nurture One Another." Since their founding in the U.S., they have expanded to include chapters in the United Kingdom, Kenya, Colombia, and Thailand.

== Partners ==
The ICCF's Conservation Council Partners include:

- 3M
- Abbott Fund
- African Wildlife Foundation
- Amata Foundation
- American Petroleum Institute
- Areva
- Association of Zoos & Aquariums
- Autodesk
- Barclays
- Cheetah Conservation Fund
- Coca-Cola Company
- Conservation International
- Corporate Council on Africa
- Dow Chemical Company
- El Paso Corporation
- ExxonMobil
- Food and Agriculture Organization
- Fort Worth Zoo
- Friends of Conservation/(A&K Philanthropy)
- Global Environment Facility
- Hewlett-Packard
- Hertz
- International League of Conservation Photographers
- International Paper
- JPMorgan Chase
- Kraft Foods
- Myriad Marketing
- National Geographic Society
- Panthera
- PG&E
- Prudential Financial
- Qualcomm
- Rainforest Alliance
- RARE
- Rare Species Fund
- Ringling Brothers and Barnum & Bailey Circus
- Safari Club International Foundation
- Save China's Tigers
- SeaWorld Parks & Entertainment
- Starbucks
- Tara Wildlife
- The Nature Conservancy
- The WILD Foundation
- Tudor Investment Corporation
- Unilever
- United Nations Foundation
- Vodacom Foundation
- Volkswagen Group of America
- Walmart
- Wilderness Foundation
- Wildlife Conservation Society
- World Wildlife Fund

== Controversy ==
In a 2013 article in Mother Jones magazine, "The Congressman, the Safari King, and the Woman Who Tried to Look Like a Cat," author Corbin Hiar pointed out appearances of impropriety among ICCF's educational travel to Africa and elsewhere, including evidence that such trips were not properly reported on lobbying reports as required by law. The article also spotlights ICCF's unwillingness to take a public stand on global warming, the Lacey Act, or other issues that might threaten economic interests of ICCF's corporate members. In a separate interview, ICCF Founder and former President David Barron was also profiled for his business dealings with African political leadership, including the governments of Nigeria and other states during periods of autocratic or dictatorial governments.

== See also ==
- United States Congressional International Conservation Caucus
