= Patagonian Desert =

Largest desert in Argentina

Patagonia Desert Patagonian Steppe
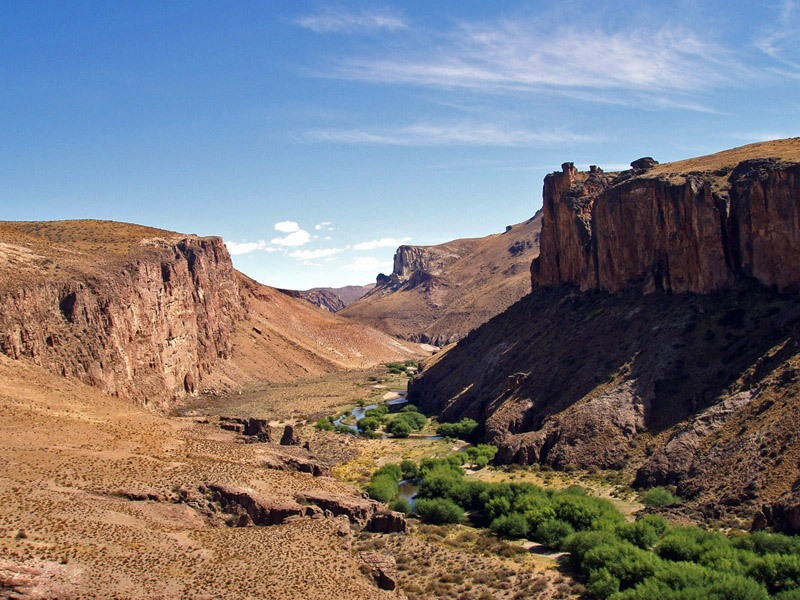
- View of the Pinturas River in the desert

- Map of the Patagonian Steppe ecoregion

Ecology
- Realm: Neotropical
- Biome: Deserts and xeric shrublands, Temperate grasslands, savannas, and shrublands
- Borders: Argentine Monte; Magellanic subpolar forests; Southern Andean steppe, Valdivian temperate forests

Geography
- Area: 572,883 km^{2} (221,191 mi^{2})
- Countries: Argentina; Chile; Falkland Islands / Islas Malvinas (disputed)
- Coordinates: 41.32°S 69.32°W

Conservation
- Conservation status: Critical/endangered
- Protected: 70,970 km^{2} (12%)

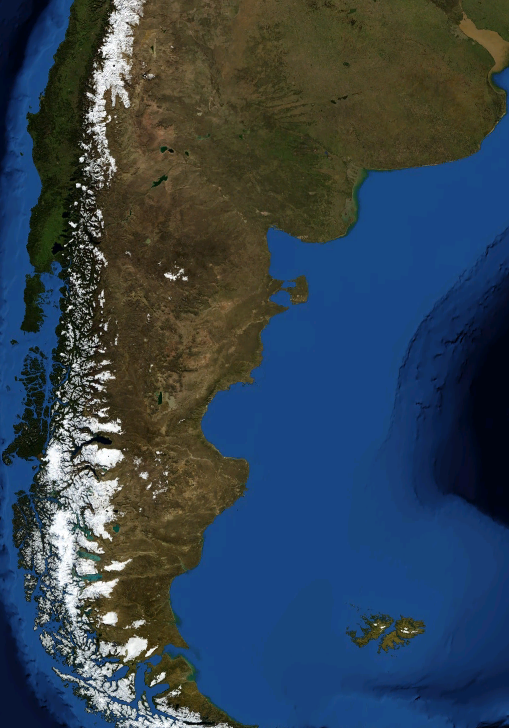
A satellite image of the Patagonian Desert by NASA World Wind.

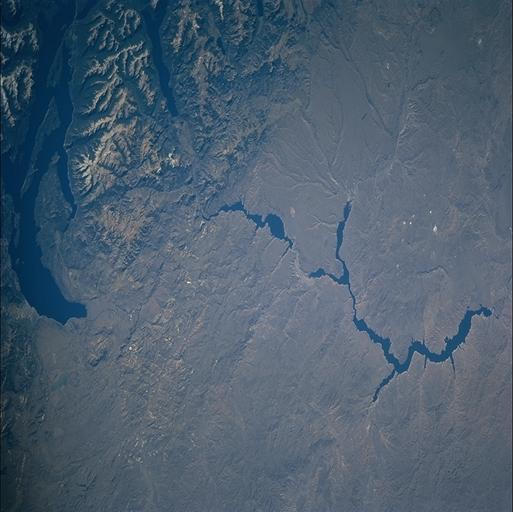
Astronaut photography of the Patagonian Desert (most of the view) contrasted with the Limay River, seen flowing eastward from the Andes.

The Patagonian Desert, also known as the Patagonian Steppe, is the largest desert in Argentina and is the eighth-largest desert in the world by area, occupying approx. 673,000 square kilometres (260,000 mi^{2}). It is located primarily in Argentina and is bounded by the Andes, to its west, and the Atlantic Ocean to its east, in the region of Patagonia, southern Argentina and areas of Chile. To the north the desert grades into the Cuyo Region and the Monte. The central parts of the steppe are dominated by shrubby and herbaceous plant species albeit to the west, where precipitation is higher, bushes are replaced by grasses. Topographically the deserts consist of alternating tablelands and massifs dissected by river valleys and canyons. The more western parts of the steppe host lakes of glacial origin and grades into barren mountains or cold temperate forests along valleys.

Inhabited by hunter-gatherers since Pre-Hispanic times, the desert faced migration in the 19th century of Argentines, Welsh, and other European peoples, transforming it from a conflictive borderland zone to an integral part of Argentina, with cattle, sheep, and horse husbandry being the primary land uses.

The Patagonian Desert has existed since the Middle Miocene (14–12 million years ago) and came into existence as the Andes rose to the west.

== Geography and climate ==
The Patagonian Desert is the largest desert south of the 40° parallel and is a large cold winter desert, where the temperature rarely exceeds 12 °C and averages just 3 °C. The region experiences about seven months of winter and five months of summer. Frost is not uncommon in the desert but, due to the very dry condition year round, snow is rare. The Andes, to the desert's west, are the primary reason for the Patagonian desert status as they inhibit the westerly flow of moisture from the southern Pacific from reaching inland. This creates a rain shadow that accounts for the formation of the desert and is why, despite approximately half of the desert being only about 200 miles from the ocean, such a large desert is found in the region. The cold Falkland Current off the Atlantic coast of South America also contributes to the area's aridity.

Different climates can be distinguished: the coast north of the 45th parallel is much milder because of the warm currents from Brazil, and the entire northern half of the region is significantly warmer in the summer, when sunny weather predominates. Daily temperatures in the summer reach 31 °C in the Rio Colorado region, a general 26 °C to 29 °C in the northern coast, and 24 °C to 28 °C in the northern plain, with nights around 12 °C to 15 °C in the coast and between 7 °C and 10 °C in the steppe. In the south, summer temperatures decrease from 22 °C to only 16 °C along the coast, and from 24 °C to 17 °C along the steppes, while nights go from 8 °C to 11 °C on the coast, and from 6 °C to 10 °C in the steppe.

During the winter, the proximity to the coast and the altitude are the main factors: while northern coastal areas have mild winters, from 2 °C at night to about 11 °C during the day, southern Santa Cruz ranges from -2 °C to 5 °C, and Tierra del Fuego, from -3 °C to 3 °C, for a mean of 0 °C. Inland, the northern areas range from 0 °C to 10 °C in low areas, and from -5 °C to 5 °C on the plateaus (again, mean around 0 °C), while in the south, low areas range from -3 °C to 4 °C, and higher areas are clearly below 0 °C. The coldest spots usually register temperatures between -20 °C and -25 °C during cold waves, and the official record is -33.9 °C in Chubut province. However, some towns claim to have had records of around -35 °C.

Summer frost is common everywhere except for the northern coast, and even sleet and light snow can fall during the warm season. Winds are constant and very strong, from the west in most cases.

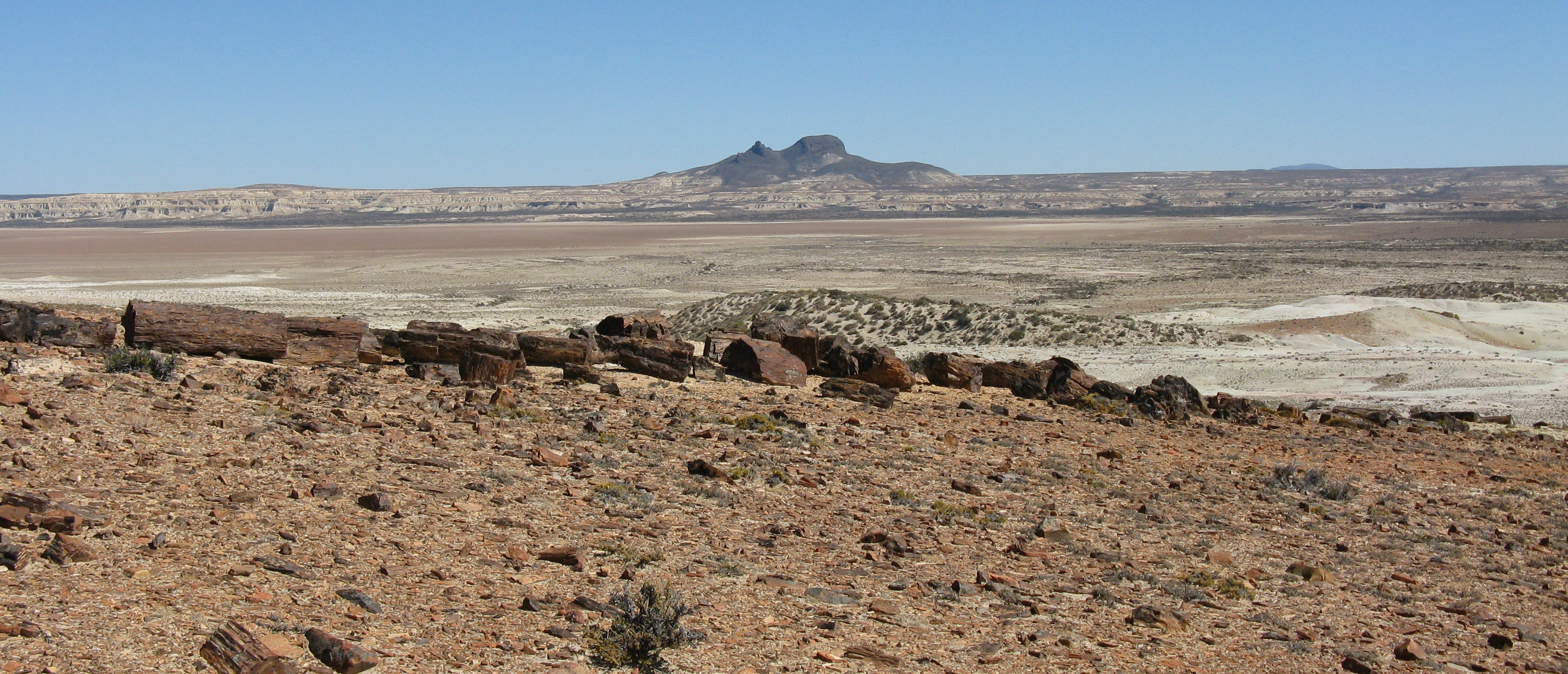
Patagonian Desert at the Bosques Petrificados de Jaramillo National Park.

Before the Andes were formed, the region was likely covered by temperate forests. However, after the formation of the Andes, ash from nearby volcanoes covered the forests and mineral-saturated waters seeped into the logs, thus fossilizing the trees and creating one of the world's best preserved petrified forests in the desert's center. The Patagonian is mainly composed of gravel plains and plateaus with sandstone canyons and clay shapes dotting the landscape, sculpted by the desert wind. The region encompassing the desert, however, has many diverse features. Ephemeral rivers, lakes, and drainage deposits from the Andes' spring melt form annually, hosting a variety of waterfowl and aquatic grasses. A variety of glacial, fluvial, and volcanic deposits are also found in the region and have significantly affected the desert's climate over time, especially contributing to the gravel sediments covering parts of the Patagonian.

The desert is quite windy as well, a result of the rain shadow effect and descending cool mountain air. This wind helps make the Patagonian one of the largest sources of dust over the South Atlantic Ocean.

On the west, the Patagonian grasslands portion of the Patagonian Desert are bounded by nothofagus forests of the Magellanic subpolar forests.

Volcanic rocks covers more than 120,000 km^{2} of the Patagonian Desert, mainly in the Somún Cura Massif (i.e. North Patagonian Massif) and the Deseado Massif. Some other volcanic areas include the Pali-Aike Volcanic Field near the Strait of Magellan. The volcanic rocks are the result of back-arc volcanism distributed mainly in two episodes: one in the Eocene and Miocene and the other from Late Miocene to Pleistocene.

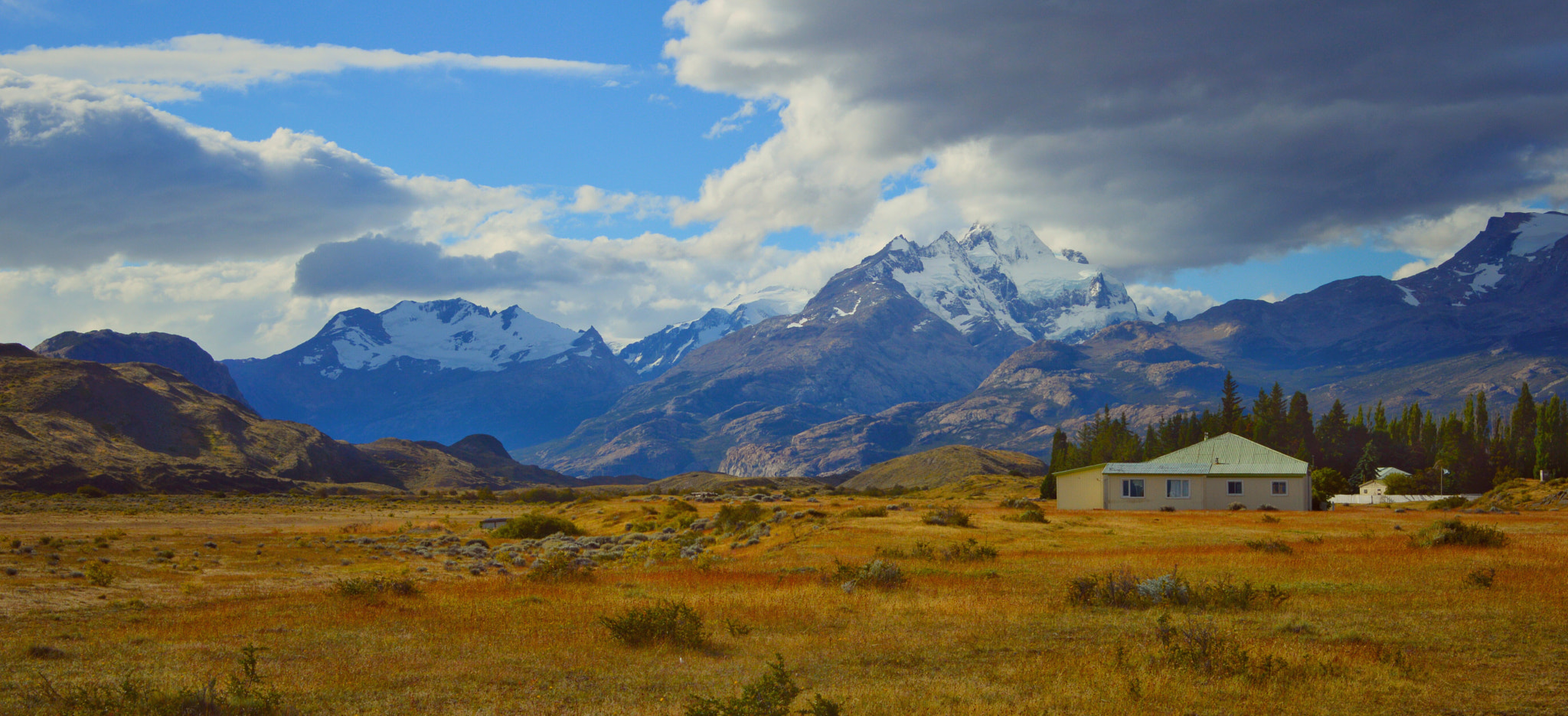
View of the Patagonian Desert and the Andes Mountains in Chubut.

== Fauna and flora ==
Despite the harsh desert environment, a number of animals venture into and live in the Patagonian. Some only live on the more habitable and geographically-varied outskirts of the desert, where food is more abundant and the environment less hostile, but all are found within the region encompassing the Patagonian. The burrowing owl, lesser rhea, guanaco, tuco-tuco, mara, pygmy armadillo, Patagonian weasel, puma, Patagonian gray fox, desert iguana, western ribbon snake, and various species of eagle and hawk are a few of the variety of animals living in the region.

The flora of the region is quite common for its climate and includes several species of desert shrubs like Acantholippia and Benthamiella and tuft grasses like Stipa and Poa. Aquatic grasses and larger flora exist on the outskirts of the desert and around the ephemeral lakes that form from the Andes' runoff.

== Human land use ==
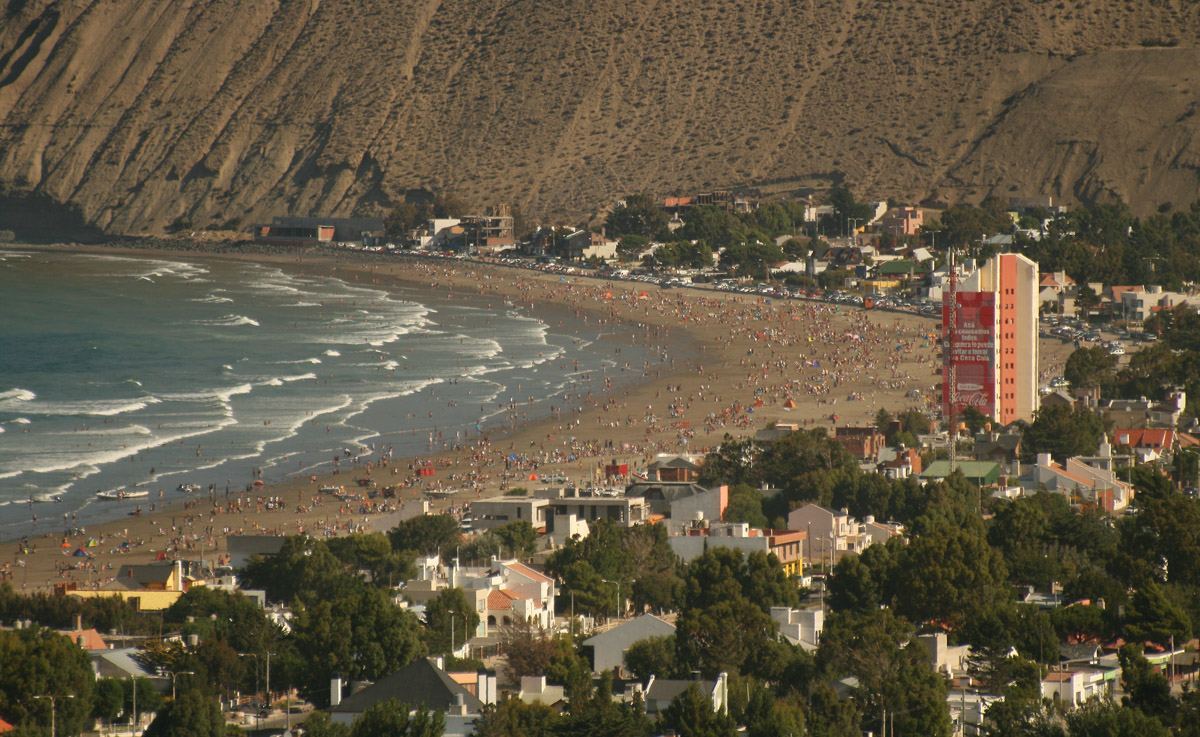
Like Rada Tilly, on the Atlantic Ocean, most of the larger settlements in the steppe are located along the coast.

The desert has hosted various indigenous peoples in its past, as evidenced by cave paintings in the area. The earliest inhabitants of the desert known by name are those of the Tehuelche complex. Tehuelches lived as hunter-gatherers and did not practise agriculture in lush valleys found in the desert. In the 18th and 19th centuries the northern part of the desert came under Mapuche influence during a process of Araucanization. Mapuches came to practise horse husbandry in the northern part of the Patagonian steppe. Mapuche tribes came to control trade across the desert and traded with the cities of southern Chile as well as Buenos Aires and the Cuyo Region.

From the mid-19th century onwards several Argentine and European settlements, some of them sporadic, appeared at the edges of the desert. The most important was established at Chubut River's outflow by Welsh immigrants in 1860. Perito Moreno explored the desert in the 1870s. In the 1870s the Argentine army undertook the Conquest of the Desert campaign, massively defeating Mapuche warlords. The Conquest of the Desert was followed by a sharp decline in the indigenous population of the desert; some were chased into Chile and peripheral areas in the Andes. It is estimated that the Conquest of the Desert caused the death of about 1,000 Native Americans. Additionally 10,000 Native Americans were taken prisoner of whom 3,000 ended up in Buenos Aires separated by sexes to avoid their procreation. The boundary treaty of 1881 between Chile and Argentina bought most of the desert under definitive Argentine sovereignty; previously Chile had claimed varying now Argentine areas under claims of inherited colonial titles.

In the few decades before and after 1900 the less dry parts of the Patagonian steppe experienced a sheep farming boom, transforming the region into one of the world's greatest exporters of ovine products.

The area is sparsely populated today and those that do live here survive mainly by the raising of livestock such as sheep and goats. Resource mining, especially of oil, gas, and coal in parts of the region, is another way humans interact with and influence the desert environment.

== Protected areas ==
A 2017 assessment found that 70,970 km^{2}, or 12%, of the ecoregion is in protected areas. Protected areas include:

- Bernardo O'Higgins National Park
- Cerro Castillo National Park
- Bosques Petrificados de Jaramillo National Park
- El Rincón Wilderness Nature Reserve
- Kawésqar National Park
- La Ascensión Wilderness Nature Reserve
- Laguna Blanca National Park
- Laguna del Diamante Nature Reserve
- Laguna San Rafael National Park
- Lanín National Park
- Leicester Falls Nature Reserve
- Los Glaciares National Park
- Monte León National Park
- Pali Aike National Park
- Patagonia National Park (Argentina)
- Patagonia National Park (Chile)
- Patagonia Wilderness Nature Reserve
- Perito Moreno National Park
- Sea Lion Island Nature Reserve
- Valdes Biosphere Reserve

== See also ==
- Desert
- Conquest of the Desert
- Magallanes Region
- Great American Desert
- Cold desert climates
- Cold semi-arid climates
