= Chacabuco River =

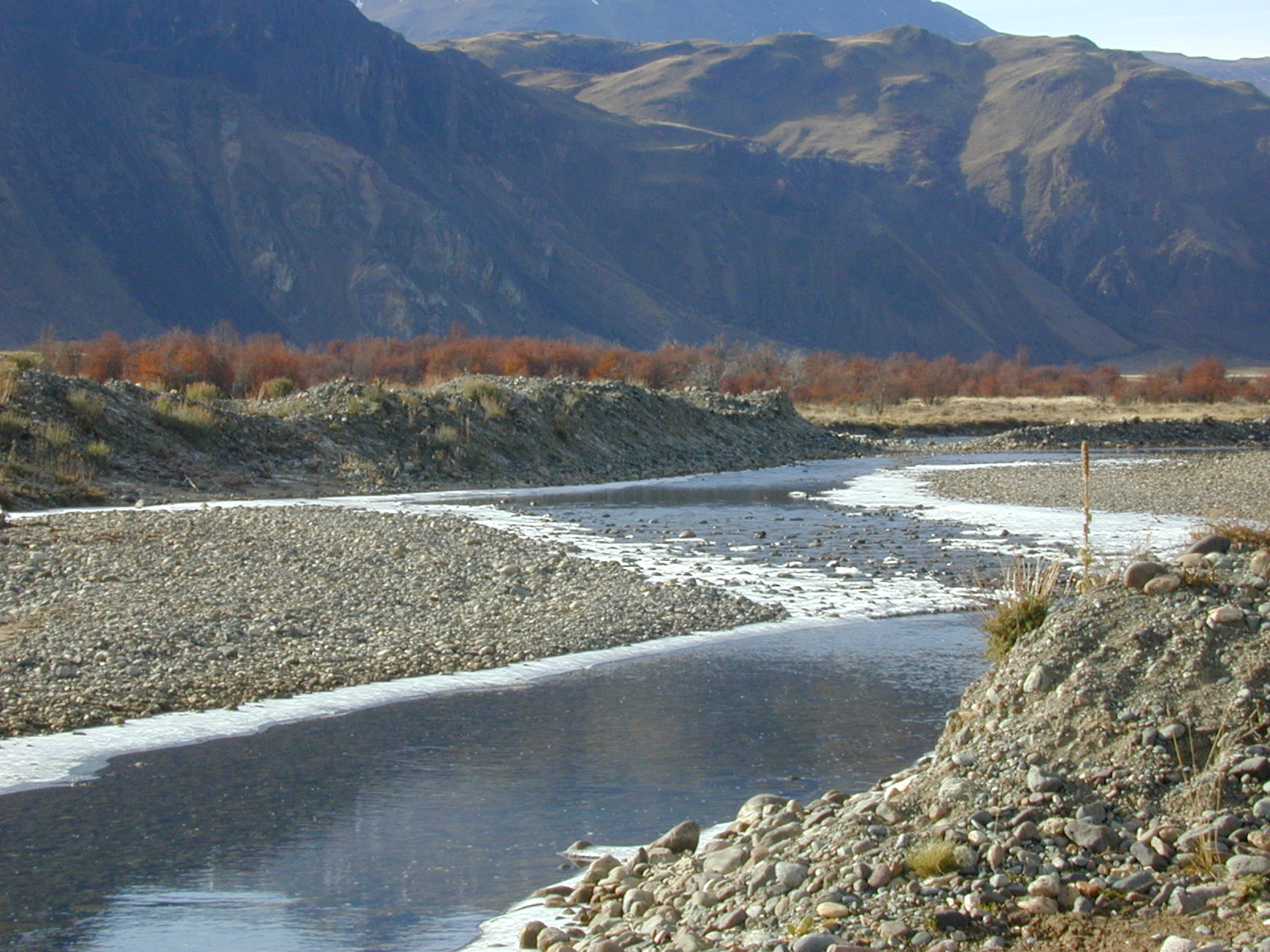

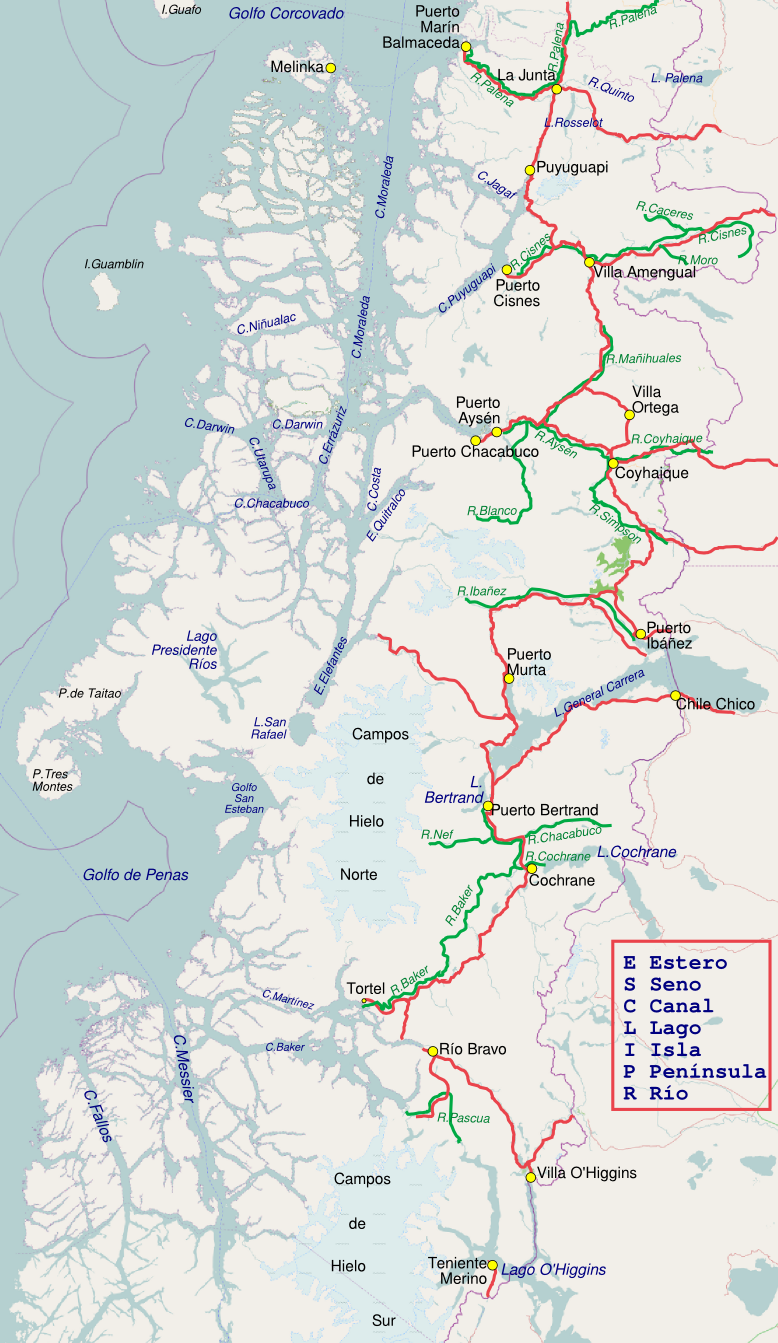
- Chacabuco River in the Aysén Region

Location
- Country: Chile

Physical characteristics
- Mouth: Baker River
  - coordinates: 47°07′51″S 72°36′52″W
- Length: 76 km (47 mi)

The Chacabuco River is a river of Chile located in the Aysén del General Carlos Ibáñez del Campo Region. The river rises in a col between Cerro Lucas Bridges and Cerro Baker. The latter is a mountain on the Argentina-Chile border, close to Roballos Pass.

Patagonia Park occupies the most of Chacabuco River Basin. There is a project to create a national park, which will comprise the lands of Patagonia Park, Lago Cochrane National Reserve and Lago Jeinimeni National Reserve.

== See also ==
- List of rivers of Chile
