= Wild Life (2023 film) =

2023 film by Chai Vasarhelyi and Jimmy Chin

- Theatrical release poster
- Directed by: Elizabeth Chai Vasarhelyi; Jimmy Chin
- Produced by: Anna Barnes; Jimmy Chin; Bob Eisenhardt; Elizabeth Chai Vasarhelyi
- Cinematography: Jimmy Chin; Clair Popkin
- Edited by: Adam Kurnitz; Bob Eisenhardt
- Music by: Gustavo Santaolalla; Juan Luqui
- Production company: Little Monster Films
- Distributed by: National Geographic Documentary Films; Picturehouse
- Release date: March 12, 2023 (United States)
- Running time: 93 minutes
- Country: United States
- Language: English
- Box office: $326,184

Wild Life is a 2023 American documentary film directed and produced by Elizabeth Chai Vasarhelyi and Jimmy Chin that follows conservationist Kris Tompkins and her husband, entrepreneur Douglas Tompkins. The film was produced by Little Monster Films for National Geographic Documentary Films and premiered at the 2023 South by Southwest Film Festival. It was released theatrically by Picturehouse in select U.S. cities on April 14, 2023, and had its broadcast debut on the National Geographic Channel on May 25, 2023, with streaming beginning on Disney+ the following day.

== Synopsis ==
Wild Life chronicles the close relationship of conservationist Kris Tompkins, the first CEO of outdoor brand Patagonia, and her husband Douglas Tompkins, an outdoorsman and entrepreneur who founded The North Face and co-founded Esprit. Together, spanning decades of work, they created national parks throughout Chile and Argentina and preserved one of the last wild places on Earth by making the largest private land donation in history.

== Production ==
In an interview for Vanity Fair at the 49th edition of the Telluride Film Festival in Colorado, director Vasarhelyi called the making of the film "a process" in order to convince Kris Tompkins to make a film depicting her journey despite being from a generation that is uncomfortable talking about itself. To overcome this, director Chin stated, "So we took it upon ourselves to do that, because they created a roadmap in conservation for future generations to follow." The filmmakers admitted intimidation at the beginning of the 8-year project, as for Chin, Doug Tompkins was his mentor, and for Vasarhelyi, they were heroes, and their story required "responsibility" and "justice".

== Release ==
On March 9, 2023, National Geographic Documentary Films and Picturehouse announced that Wild Life, by Academy Award-winning directors Chai Vasarhelyi and Jimmy Chin, had a surprise screening at the 2022 Telluride Film Festival and that it would be part of the 2023 SXSW Film Festival beginning on March 12, 2023. It was also announced that Picturehouse would open the film theatrically in select cities beginning on April 14, 2023, in New York City and Washington, D.C., with additional dates to follow in cities throughout the United States until May 5, and that it would have its broadcast debut on the National Geographic Channel on May 25, 2023, and on the streaming service Disney+ the following day.

== Reception ==
=== Box office ===
As of May 25, 2023, Wild Life has grossed an estimated $326,184 in both domestic and worldwide distribution sales.

=== Critical response ===
On the review aggregator website Rotten Tomatoes, 91% of 32 critics' reviews are positive, with an average rating of 6.70/10. Metacritic, which uses a weighted average, assigned the film a score of 67 out of 100, based on 9 critics, indicating "generally favorable" reviews.

In The New York Times, Amy Nicholson called the film "a rickety helicopter tour of a fascinating marriage; nearly every scene makes you want to stop and explore in more detail." In her film review for IndieWire, Esther Zuckerman saw the film as "a documentary that comes off mostly as a PR stunt" and found it to be "merely just a celebration of these rich people doing the 'right thing' with their money." In Variety, Guy Lodge called it an "emotionally stirring documentary," and for The Washington Post, Thomas Floyd called it "a galvanizing tale of philanthropy."
