= Patagonia National Park (Chile) =

National park in Chile

- IUCN category II (national park)
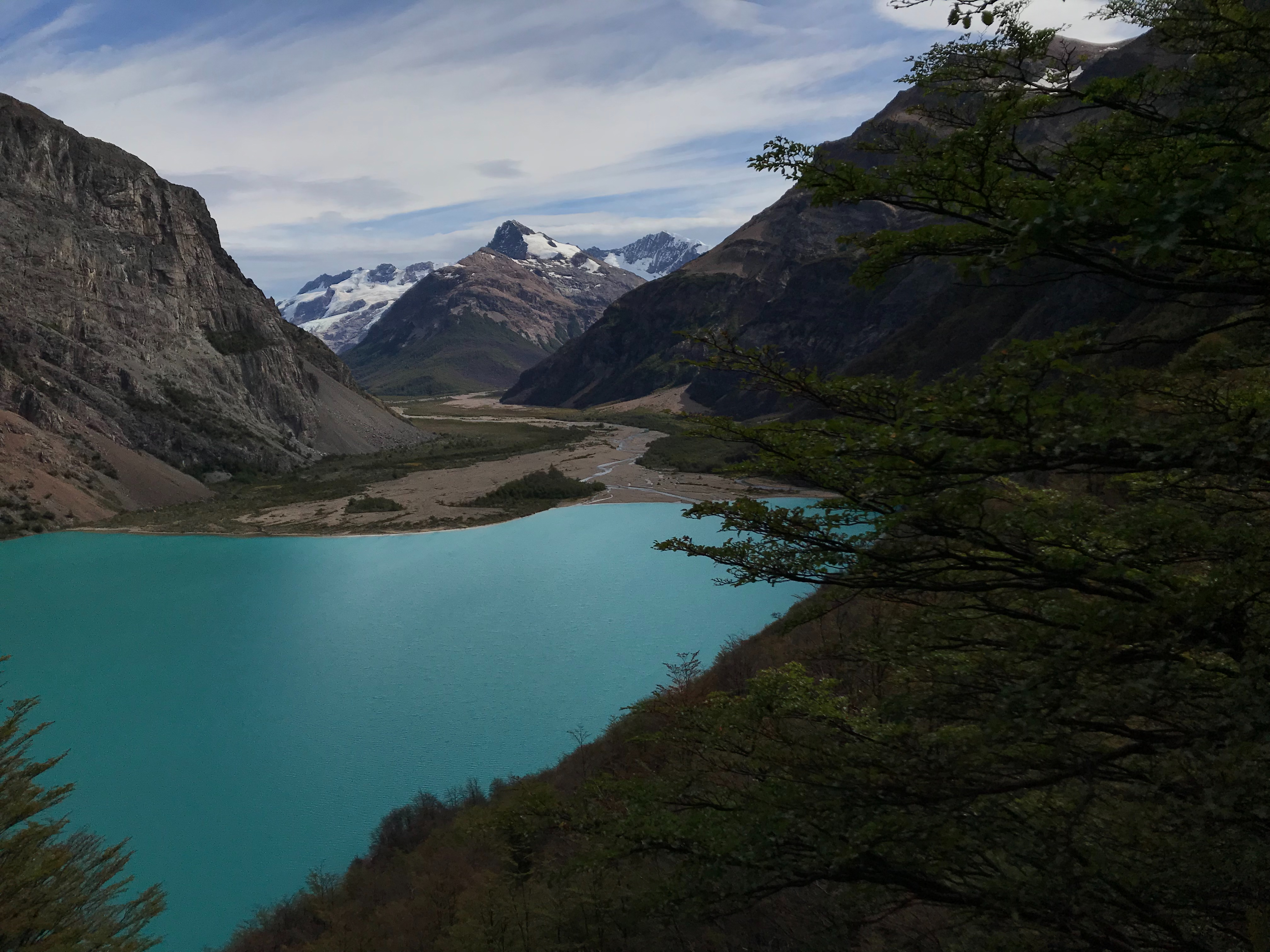
- Lago Verde, Sector Jeinimeni, Patagonia National Park

- Location within Chile
- Location: Aysén Region, Chile
- Coordinates: 47°07′06″S 72°29′05″W
- Area: 3,045.28 km^{2} (1,175.79 sq mi)
- Designation: National park
- Designated: 2018
- Governing body: National Forest Corporation (CONAF)

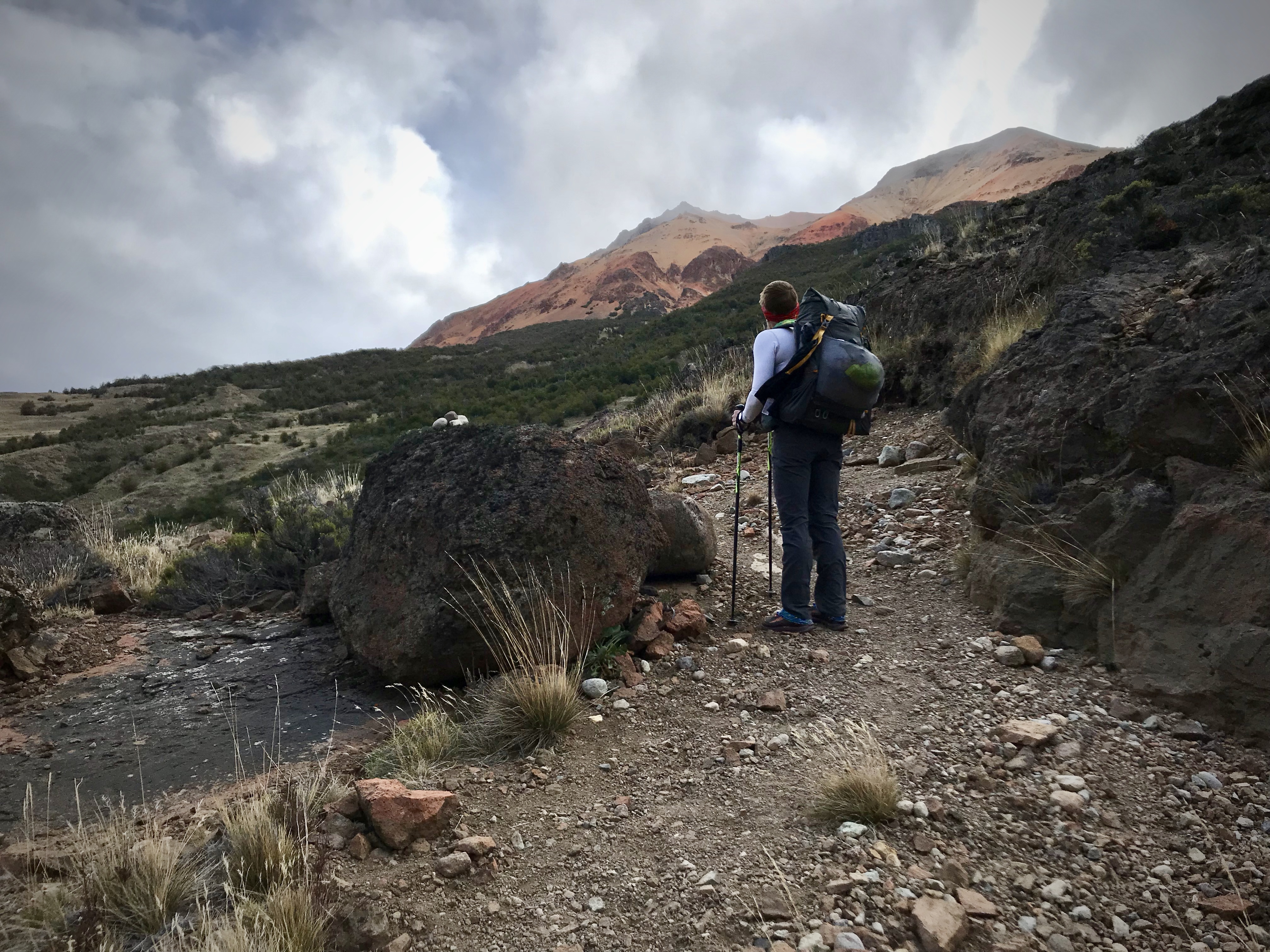
Hiking along the Aviles Valley Trail, Patagonia National Park

Patagonia National Park (Spanish: Parque Nacional Patagonia) is a national park in the Aysén Region of Chile. Once a private nature reserve operated as a public-access park, it was donated to the government of Chile by Tompkins Conservation in 2018.

The heart of the park is the Chacabuco Valley, an ecologically significant east-west valley that forms a pass over the Andes Mountains, resulting in a transition zone between the Patagonian steppe grasslands of Argentine Patagonia and the southern beech forests of Chilean Patagonia to the west. It is located between General Carrera Lake to the north and Cochrane Lake to the south and extends to the Argentine border to the east. The park contains a network of trails and campgrounds, as well as a visitor center.

The park was created by Conservacion Patagonica, a nonprofit founded with the intent of protecting Patagonia's wildlands and ecosystems. Conservacion Patagonica merged into Tompkins Conservation in 2018.

On 29 January 2018, Chilean President Michelle Bachelet and Kris Tompkins, President of Tompkins Conservation, signed a decree creating 5 national parks, one of which was Patagonia National Park. Parque Patagonia was gifted to the Chilean state and combined with Lago Jeinimeni National Reserve, Lago Cochrane National Reserve, and other additional lands to form Patagonia National Park, with a combined area of 260,000 hectares (640,000 acres).

== History of Patagonia National Park ==
The Patagonia National Park Project consists of four major program areas: buying land, restoring biodiversity, building public access, and engaging communities.

=== Buying land ===
Originally one of the region's largest sheep ranches, Estancia Valle Chacabuco changed hands many times over the 20th century. British explorer Lucas Bridges established the area as ranchland in 1908. In 1964, under the administration of Eduardo Frei Montalva, the land was expropriated and divided among several local families. The Pinochet administration later reclaimed the land, which was subsequently sold to Belgian landowner Francoise de Smet in 1980.

Kris and Doug Tompkins first visited the Chacabuco Valley in 1995. CONAF (Chile's National Forest Corporation) had listed the Chacabuco Valley as a top conservation priority for over 30 years due to its unique array of native ecosystems. In 2004, after two decades of declining profits, Conservación Patagónica (now Tompkins Conservation) purchased the 70,600-hectare (174,500-acre) Estancia Valle Chacabuco from de Smet and began acquiring smaller holdings from willing sellers in the Chacabuco Valley, with the aim of creating a continuous reserve to connect with the nearby Jeinimeni and Lago Cochrane (Tamango) national reserves.

=== Restoring biodiversity ===
The Chacabuco Valley, the heart of Patagonia National Park, was for generations a vast sheep and cattle ranch, with almost 25,000 animals being raised on the land annually. The native grasslands were degraded by years of intense livestock grazing, leading to desertification of the soils and the decline of wildlife populations native to the grasslands. With the purchase of the Estancia in 2004, Conservación Patagónica began removing fencing and re-seeding former pastures with native grasses, opening up the land for native species such as the guanaco and the endangered huemul deer. In 2022, Conservación Patagónica identified the recovery of the huemul as a top priority, as the park's population of 100–200 individuals was one of the largest known surviving populations on Earth.

==== Ecosystem restoration ====
Patagonia has experienced significant ecological degradation due to intensive sheep ranching on its sandy arid soils, resulting in widespread desertification. In transitioning from a sheep ranch to a national park, Conservación Patagónica aimed to reverse these damages, restore productive habitat, and create a model of ecosystem restoration for Patagonia. The grasslands recovery program, launched in 2004, began with the removal of almost all livestock. Conservación Patagónica's volunteer program performed much of the ecosystem restoration work. By 2011, they had removed over half of the 640 kilometers (400 miles) of habitat-fragmenting ranch fencing. Volunteers also collected seeds from native coirón grasses, which were used to re-seed heavily damaged areas by professional ecosystem restoration workers.

==== Wildlife recovery ====
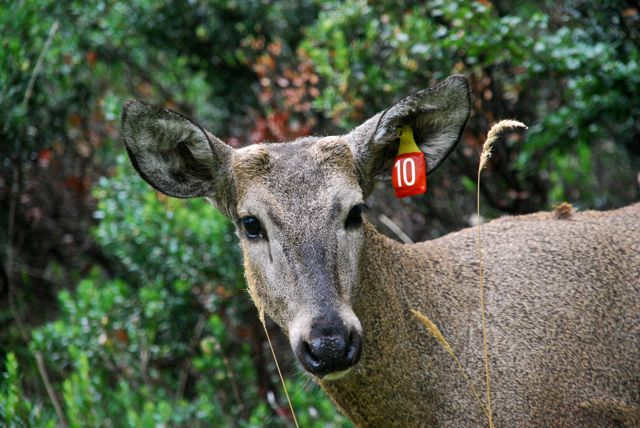
Endangered huemul deer, collared as part of recovery program

Conservación Patagónica's large-scale ecosystem restoration work, now carried out by Rewilding Chile, serves as the foundation for targeted species-specific programs, such as efforts to monitor and protect the endangered huemul deer. As the area returns to a more natural state, populations of keystone species are finding a new equilibrium. With livestock removed, grasslands are producing more and higher quality food for a range of herbivores, which now have access to prime habitats and can roam freely without fences. Wildlife recovery programs build on this ecosystem-level transition to protect keystone species. The huemul deer is a top priority for the Patagonia National Park project; habitat loss, diseases transmitted from livestock, hunting, and predation by domestic dogs have reduced its population to around 1,500 individuals. Tracking pumas with GPS collars provides new information about their predation patterns, home ranges, and movements, which is critical given their proximity to the huemul deer population. Conservación Patagónica also implemented strategies such as using livestock guardian dogs to mitigate predator-livestock conflicts.

=== Building public access ===
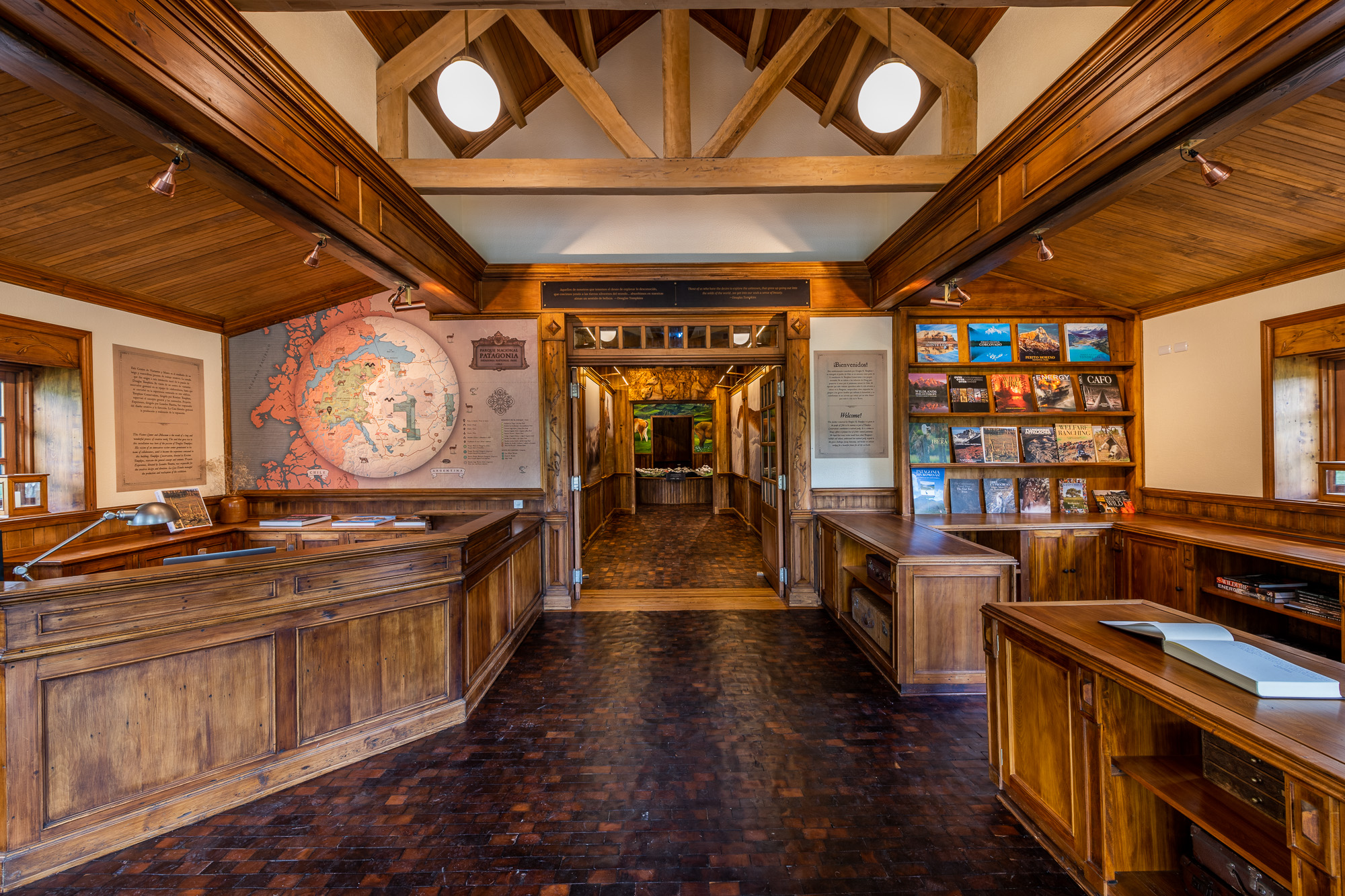
Interior of the Visitor Center in Patagonia National Park

A major focus of the Patagonia National Park project was constructing durable, accessible public infrastructure to provide visitors with a comfortable and engaging experience at the park. The project included building a park headquarters that features overnight accommodations, a restaurant, a museum, and a visitor center. The architecture reflects historic Patagonian styles and uses local materials, such as on-site quarried stone and recycled wood, to ensure durability and minimal upkeep. Additionally, an innovative renewable energy system, composed of solar, wind, and mini-hydro generation facilities, makes the park energy-independent and minimizes its carbon footprint. Trails and campgrounds were also constructed to allow visitors to access the wilderness areas of the park and the neighboring reserves. These efforts aimed to bolster ecotourism in the region, support local businesses, and foster a deeper respect for nature among visitors.

=== Engaging communities ===
From the beginning of the project, collaborations were developed with neighboring communities to increase local visits to the park, provide employment opportunities, and facilitate the development of a successful ecotourism economy. Efforts to engage the community included offering jobs to former gauchos and retraining them as park rangers and conservation workers. A school outreach program brings local children into the park to learn about endangered species such as the huemul deer and the benefits of conservation. Conservación Patagónica also hosts an annual Huemul Festival and hike, and has provided scholarships, known as Huemul scholarships, allowing over fifty students to continue their studies.

== Ecology ==
Located in the transition zone between the arid steppe of Argentine Patagonia and the temperate southern beech forests of Chilean Patagonia, Parque Patagonia encompasses an array of ecosystems including grassland, riparian forest, and wetlands.

The dry steppe grasslands of Argentine Patagonia are characterized by minimal rainfall, cold, dry winds, and sandy soil. The Andean Mountains block moisture from flowing west, creating this arid region. Several plants have been able to adapt to this harsh environment, including shrubs like calafate, quilembay and yaoyín, and tuft grasses like flechilla and coirón poa. These grasslands support hardy animals such as the burrowing owl, the gray fox, tuco-tuco, mara, armadillos, various eagle and hawk species, and keystone predators like the puma. A wide range of animals thrives in the more habitable outskirts of the desert and around ephemeral lakes formed from the Andes' runoff, where trees and more nutritious aqueous grasses can grow.

Moving west and climbing the vertical gradient of the Andes Mountains, the park's flora and fauna changes notably. The landscape begins to transform into forests, which consist mostly of three species of the southern beech (Nothofagus) genus: lenga, ñire, and coiue. Here, rainfall can be very high, generating dense forests, full of nutrients from high leaf litter. These forests host 370 vascular plant genera, which are vital to the survival of the surrounding fauna. Some significant mammals include the endangered huemul deer, puma, red fox, and various species of bats. The forests of Parque Patagonia also contain a variety of bird species including the Andean condor, Magellanic woodpecker, spectacled duck, black-necked swan, pygmy owl, black-faced ibis, Chilean flamingo, Austral negrito, Southern lapwing and a range of amphibians and reptiles.

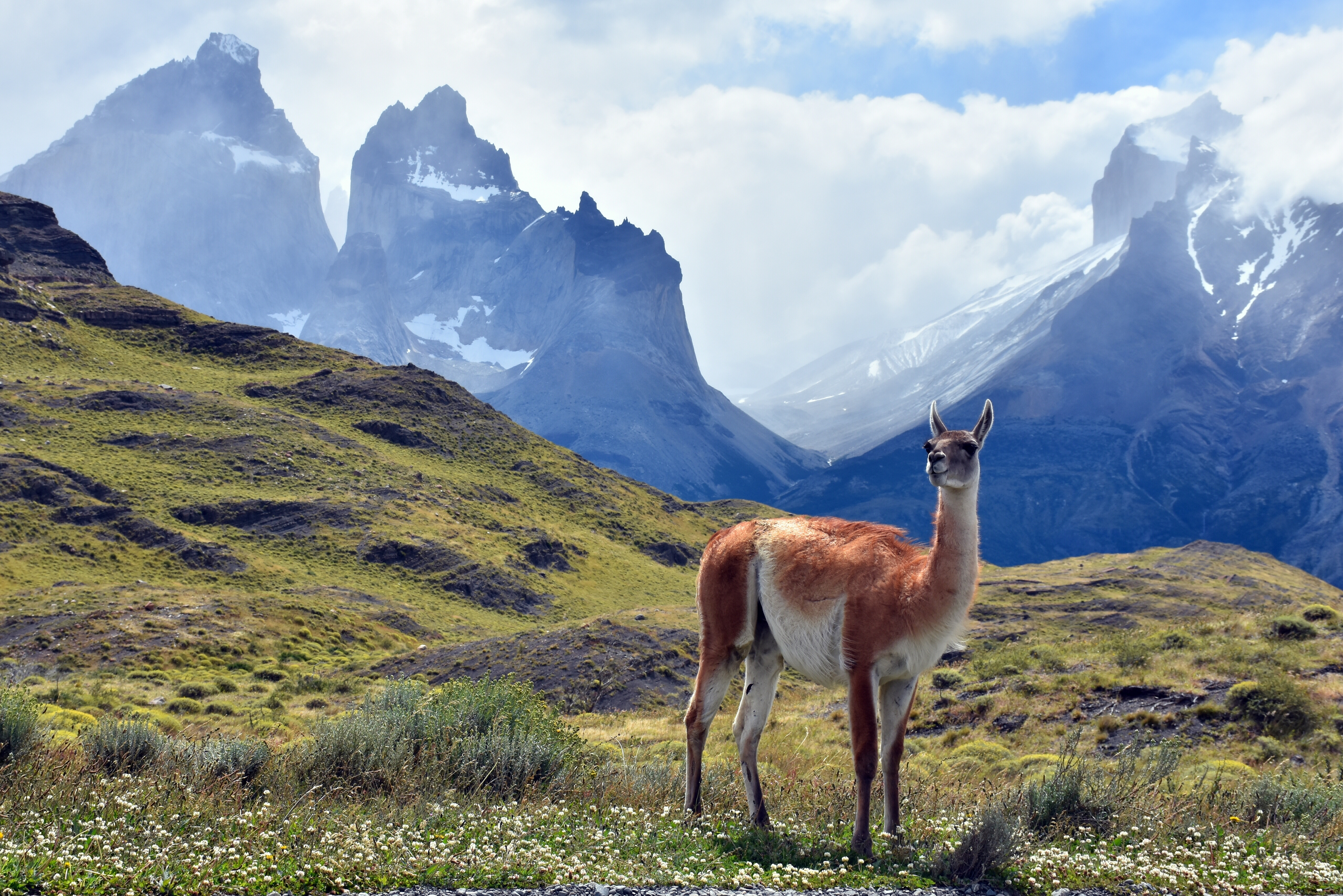
A guanaco in the Patagonia steppe

Throughout Patagonia, the guanaco, a large camelid that is a wild relative of the llama, is the most abundant herbivore. It feeds on 75% of all plant species in the Patagonian steppe. The guanaco acts as a keystone species: it prevents domination of grass species, acts as a disperser and fertilizes, and has high reproductive rates, providing food for local carnivores, especially pumas.

Although the park lies on the eastern side of the Andes, its glacier-fed streams and rivers run toward the Pacific Ocean. Their turquoise blue water is home to substantial populations of native fish such as perch (Percichthys trucha), pejerrey patagonico (Odontesthes hatcheri) and puyen (Galaxias maculatus). Atlantic salmon, as well as brook, brown, and rainbow trout, have been introduced to the area.

== Visiting the park ==
Parque Patagonia is open from October to April and is only accessible by car. It is south of Coyhaique, Chile and north of Cochrane, Chile. The closest airport is in Balmaceda, Chile (BBA). A 300 km drive from Balmaceda on the Carretera Austral is necessary to reach the park. As of March 2018, the Carretera Austral is only paved between Balmaceda and Cerro Castillo, Chile. The remaining portion of the highway to the park is unpaved. The ranger station in Sector Jeinimeni is easily reachable by car in about 1.5 hours from the town of Chile Chico. It is a 2-to-5-day hike along the Aviles Trail to the Lodge at Valle Chacabuco.

The Lodge at Valle Chacabuco, at the center of the park, houses the park's main tourist infrastructure, including a lodge, restaurant, visitor center and employee housing.

There are also three campgrounds in the park.

== Patagonia National Park in the media ==
- Our Great National Parks, a Netflix documentary series narrated by Barack Obama, showcased this park in its second episode "Chilean Patagonia".
