= Fundación Vida Silvestre Argentina =

Argentine civil foundation

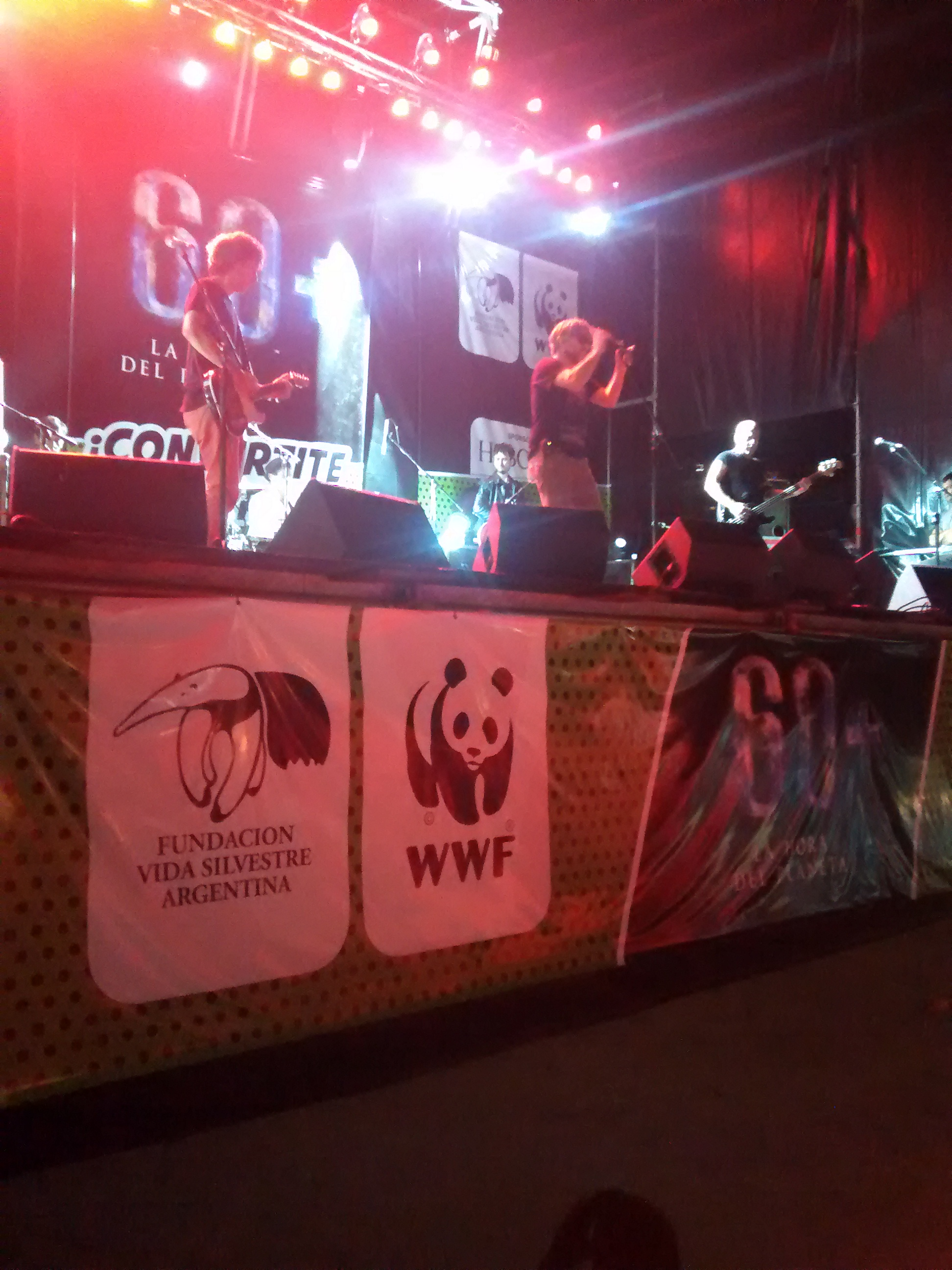
- La Hora del Planeta 2015 en Buenos Aires
- Abbreviation: FVSA
- Formation: 29 June 1977 ^{a}
- Type: Charitable trust
- Headquarters: Buenos Aires, Buenos Aires, Argentina
- Region served: Argentina
- Methods: Lobbying; Research; Consultancy

Fundación Vida Silvestre Argentina (Argentine Wildlife Foundation) is a civil association focused on environmental issues in Argentina. It was founded in 1977. Its mission is to propose and implement solutions for nature conservation, promote the sustainable use of natural resources, and encourage responsible behavior in the context of climate change. The foundation achieves its goals through various actions, including the protection of natural areas, advocating for environmental legislation, promoting awareness and education, and encouraging responsible consumption and production.

Since 1988, Vida Silvestre has represented the World Wildlife Fund (WWF) in Argentina, although it maintained its own brand.

Vida Silvestre's vision is to create a world where human beings develop in harmony with nature. Currently, the organization focuses its efforts on five priority eco-regions in Argentina due to their rich biodiversity and endangered status. These regions include the Upper Paraná jungle in the Atlantic Forest, the Gran Chaco, the Pampas, the Argentine Sea and its shores, and Antarctica and the southern oceans.

Vida Silvestre operates two offices, located in Buenos Aires and Puerto Iguazú. Additionally, the organization manages two nature reserves: Urugua-í in Andresito, Misiones and San Pablo de Valdés in Valdés Peninsula, Chubut.

Fundación Vida Silvestre is a member of the Partner Circle of the Foundations Platform F20, which is an international network comprising foundations and philanthropic organizations.

== About Vida Silvestre ==
=== History ===
After the passing of Alix Reynal on April 28, 1976, her father Miguel Reynal sought to create a living tribute to honor her memory. Inspired by Alix's profound happiness when immersed in nature, he established an organization dedicated to the conservation of Argentina's wildlife. During his mourning, Reynal reached out to influential figures in the country's conservation field.

Backed by Jose Maria Gallardo, director of the Bernardino Rivadavia Natural Sciences Argentine Museum, and Maximo Gainza, director editor of La Prensa daily newspaper, Miguel Reynal gathered a group of thirty individuals from diverse fields such as science, sports, culture, politics, and business. United by a shared vision, they embarked on the challenge of establishing an institution. On June 29, 1977, they officially signed an agreement at the Museum.

From the very beginning, their approach focused on achieving gradual and tangible outcomes supported by scientific expertise. The organization's management was entrusted to a committee of specialists who played a crucial role in selecting programs and evaluating their results. In 1988, Vida Silvestre became the official representative of the World Wildlife Fund (WWF) in Argentina.

=== Workteam ===
The management of Fundación Vida Silvestre is structured into two distinct entities.

The administrative council, currently presided over by Matías Brea, plays a vital role in overseeing the organization's governance and overall strategic direction. This council ensures efficient decision-making processes and effective coordination of activities. Additionally, a scientific committee consisting of a team of specialists provides valuable support and expertise to the administrative council, contributing scientific insights and recommendations.

The management structure of Vida Silvestre consists of a dedicated team comprising approximately 50 individuals. This diverse team encompasses professionals from various fields, including biologists, agriculturalists, foresters, electrical engineers, geographers, museum specialists, communicators, teachers, lawyers, environmental scientists, and politicians. Working collectively, they contribute their respective expertise and skills to further the organization's mission. These team members are spread across three offices located in Buenos Aires, Iguazu, and Mar del Plata, strategically positioned to facilitate efficient operations and effective engagement in different regions.

Since 2017, Manuel Jaramillo has served as the CEO of Vida Silvestre, assuming the responsibility of leading and guiding the organization. Under his leadership, Vida Silvestre continues to make significant strides in its conservation efforts and environmental initiatives.

== Work ==
Vida Silvestre's work revolves around addressing the critical issue of overuse of natural resources, a topic of utmost importance in the present world.

Currently, human activity surpasses the Earth's capacity to sustainably provide resources. In fact, it is estimated that we require 1.3 planets to sustain our current levels of consumption while also conserving endangered species and ecosystems.

The visible consequences of humanity's excessive utilization of natural resources are prominently seen in the form of climate change, which poses significant challenges on a global scale. In response to this pressing situation, Vida Silvestre has formulated four key work strategies to tackle these challenges head-on.

=== For more protected areas ===
In 1983, Vida Silvestre conducted a survey of the Urugua-í stream in Misiones, which led to the creation of the Islas Malvinas Provincial Reserve, safeguarding 10,000 hectares of Atlantic rainforest. Subsequently, the Uruguaí Provincial Park expanded to cover an impressive 87,000 hectares. In 1986, based on recommendations by Vida Silvestre, the Somuncura Plateau in Patagonia was designated as the Somuncura Plateau Provincial Reserve, spanning one million hectares in northern Patagonia. Building on this momentum, Vida Silvestre initiated the comprehensive evaluation of Patagonia's coastal areas, resulting in the establishment of the Cabo Blanco Provincial Park and the Isla Pinguino Complex – Oso Marino Bay, later declared an inter-jurisdictional marine park in 2010. Additionally, Vida Silvestre played a crucial role in the creation of Monte Leon Island, a national park since 2004.

The organization's efforts extend beyond government-designated protected areas. Vida Silvestre has been instrumental in establishing the first two private reserves in Argentina, namely Laguna de los Escarchados in the province of Santa Cruz in 1979 and Campos del Tuyú, a wildlife reserve in the province of Buenos Aires. The latter was later donated to the National Parks Administration in 2009, becoming the first national park in the Pampas grasslands.

Vida Silvestre's dedication to conservation is evident in its partnership with various stakeholders. Collaborative agreements with Alto Paraná S.A. led to the creation of the Urugua-í Wildlife Reserve, bordering the Urugua-í Provincial Park. Additionally, the organization established the San Pablo de Valdés Wildlife Reserve, the first private property protecting habitat within the Peninsula Valdés provincial natural area, recognized as a UNESCO World Heritage site.

Vida Silvestre's achievements are not limited to land-based conservation efforts. In 1983, it facilitated an agreement with the San Isidro municipality, resulting in the creation of the Ribera Norte Wildlife Refuge, the country's first protected municipal area. Moreover, the Costanera Sur Ecological Reserve, a significant biodiversity hotspot spanning over 300 hectares in Buenos Aires city, was established thanks to a coordinated effort by Vida Silvestre.

The organization's contributions extend beyond Argentina's borders. It has actively participated in environmental impact studies of gas pipelines in the northern Andes and the Atacama Desert, proposing compensatory measures. This led to the creation of the El Nogalar reserve and the Provincial Park Laguna Pintascayo in Salta Province.

Recognizing the importance of capacity building, Vida Silvestre has provided training to 50 technicians, rangers and volunteers for protected areas along the Atlantic coasts of Argentina, Uruguay, and the State of Rio Grande do Sul (Brazil). These training initiatives focused on monitoring migratory shorebirds and were conducted in collaboration with ranger training centers. Vida Silvestre also offers scholarships to students from the Urugua-í and San Pablo de Valdés Wildlife Reserves, further contributing to conservation education.

Since 1987, Vida Silvestre has pioneered the Vida Silvestre Wildlife Refuge Programme, the first system of voluntarily protected areas in Argentina and a groundbreaking initiative for Latin America. This program encompasses over 177,000 hectares of ecologically significant land spread across nine provinces in the country. Many of these protected areas have a decade-long track record of successful conservation efforts.

In recent years, Vida Silvestre has embraced citizen science, collaborating with iNaturalist in the ArgentiNat project. This initiative empowers users to contribute data on biodiversity, fostering a broader understanding and engagement with Argentina's natural world.

=== Towards effective legislation ===
Vida Silvestre actively engages in environmental legislation and policy advocacy to ensure the protection of Argentina's natural resources and biodiversity. The organization works closely with governments, legislators, and other organizations to influence and shape environmental laws and regulations. One notable achievement was their involvement in the first environmental case against illegal wildlife trade, resulting in a conviction. They also played a significant role in collecting citizen signatures to support the inclusion of Environmental Crime in the Civil Code. Vida Silvestre was instrumental in the passage of the Woodland Law (Ley de Bosques) in 2007, which empowers provinces to manage their native woodlands and categorize them based on conservation value and allowable uses. Since the implementation of the law, annual deforestation rates have reduced by nearly 20 percent.

Vida Silvestre emphasizes the importance of protecting the Chaco eco-region, which has experienced significant woodland loss. The organization actively monitors and participates in the application of the Woodland Law in priority eco-regions such as Gran Chaco and the Panaraense rainforest. In 2013, Vida Silvestre promoted the creation of the first Protected Marine Area in Argentina, known as the Burdwood Bank, to safeguard the diverse marine ecosystem. They also organized the International Meeting on Protected Oceanic Marine Areas to enhance local capacity and promote the establishment of a comprehensive system of marine conservation.

=== For responsible production and consumption ===
Vida Silvestre works towards responsible production and consumption in Argentina by promoting sustainable practices in forestry, energy, fishery, and livestock sectors.

In forestry, they promote responsible forest management through the adoption of Forest Stewardship Council (FSC) standards and certification. They have actively participated in developing Argentina's norms for forest management.

In energy, Vida Silvestre advocates for renewable energy sources and energy efficiency. They support the implementation of energy efficiency labeling on products to help consumers make informed choices.

In fishery, they strive for sustainable fishing practices based on scientific information and ecosystemic approaches. They advocate for participatory governance, monitoring systems, and responsible fishing techniques. They support the Marine Stewardship Council (MSC) certification program.

In livestock, Vida Silvestre collaborates with ranchers to conserve the Pampas grassland, a vital ecosystem for biodiversity and cattle raising. They promote sustainable cattle ranching practices and have implemented conservation initiatives.

=== Toward more awareness and environmental education ===
Since 1982, Vida Silvestre has published its magazine, becoming Argentina's first publication to address conservation topics.

=== Work with local fauna ===
Vida Silvestre is actively involved in the conservation of local fauna, focusing on several key species.

Pampas Deer: In 1992, Vida Silvestre launched a campaign to "adopt" Pampas deer, a critically endangered grassland species with only four small populations remaining in Argentina. They established the Campos del Tuyú natural reserve to protect their habitat. The organization also promotes sustainable cattle ranching in the neighboring lands, which provide prime habitat for the endangered deer. Preservation of the habitat through proper management and husbandry practices is crucial for their conservation. Vida Silvestre has undertaken initiatives to protect other deer species as well. The Huemul Project, started in 1986, focuses on the preservation of one of the rarest deer species in the world, found in Argentina's Patagonia region. Additionally, they have worked on the conservation of the pudu, collaborating with the New York Zoological Society and the National Parks Administration to establish a breeding facility on Victoria Island and reintroduce the species into Nahuel Huapi National Park.

Cetaceans: Vida Silvestre is actively involved in monitoring and supporting the recovery of southern right whales and other cetaceans. They regulate activities in the gulfs and Nueva Bay, areas where these species breed and bear their offspring. Through aerial census conducted by the Centro Nacional Patagonico, it has been determined that the number of whales visiting the Valdés Peninsula has doubled in the last decade, reaching around 2,500. Vida Silvestre maintains a photographic catalogue for identification and supports the implementation of behavioral codes for whale watching through collaborative efforts with tour operators, agencies, research institutes, and other NGOs. Also it works protecting the critically endangered Plata Dolphin as a flagship species.

Pumas and Guanacos: In 2012, Vida Silvestre launched a campaign to protect pumas and guanacos. Proposed laws declaring them as "plague species" triggered public support, leading Vida Silvestre to advocate against such measures. They sent letters to the responsible authorities in each province and collected 36,000 signatures within a week to support their cause.

Jaguars: With fewer than 200 jaguars remaining in Argentina, Vida Silvestre considers their conservation a priority. The loss of woodland and forest habitats, illegal hunting, conflicts with livestock, and the decline of their prey species directly threaten their survival. Vida Silvestre has funded research projects in collaboration with various organizations and developed a jaguar conservation plan. The studies conducted in the Paranaense Rain Forest have revealed a significant decline in the jaguar population over the past 15 years. To address this alarming situation, Vida Silvestre provides financial support and raises awareness about jaguar conservation issues. The jaguar is also a priority species for WWF, and both organizations support jaguar conservation programs in countries like Peru and Brazil.

Documentary: In 2014, Vida Silvestre contributed to the release of the documentary "Jaguar: The Last Frontier," directed by Marcelo Viñas and produced by Juan Maria Raggio. Narrated by Ricardo Darin, the documentary highlights the current status of the species and the challenges it faces. It reached a wide audience through cinema screenings, festivals, and online distribution, reaching over 25,000 people in Argentina.

== See also ==
- World Wide Fund for Nature (WWF)
