= Douglas Tompkins =

Chilean-American businessman and environmentalist (1943–2015)

Doug Tompkins
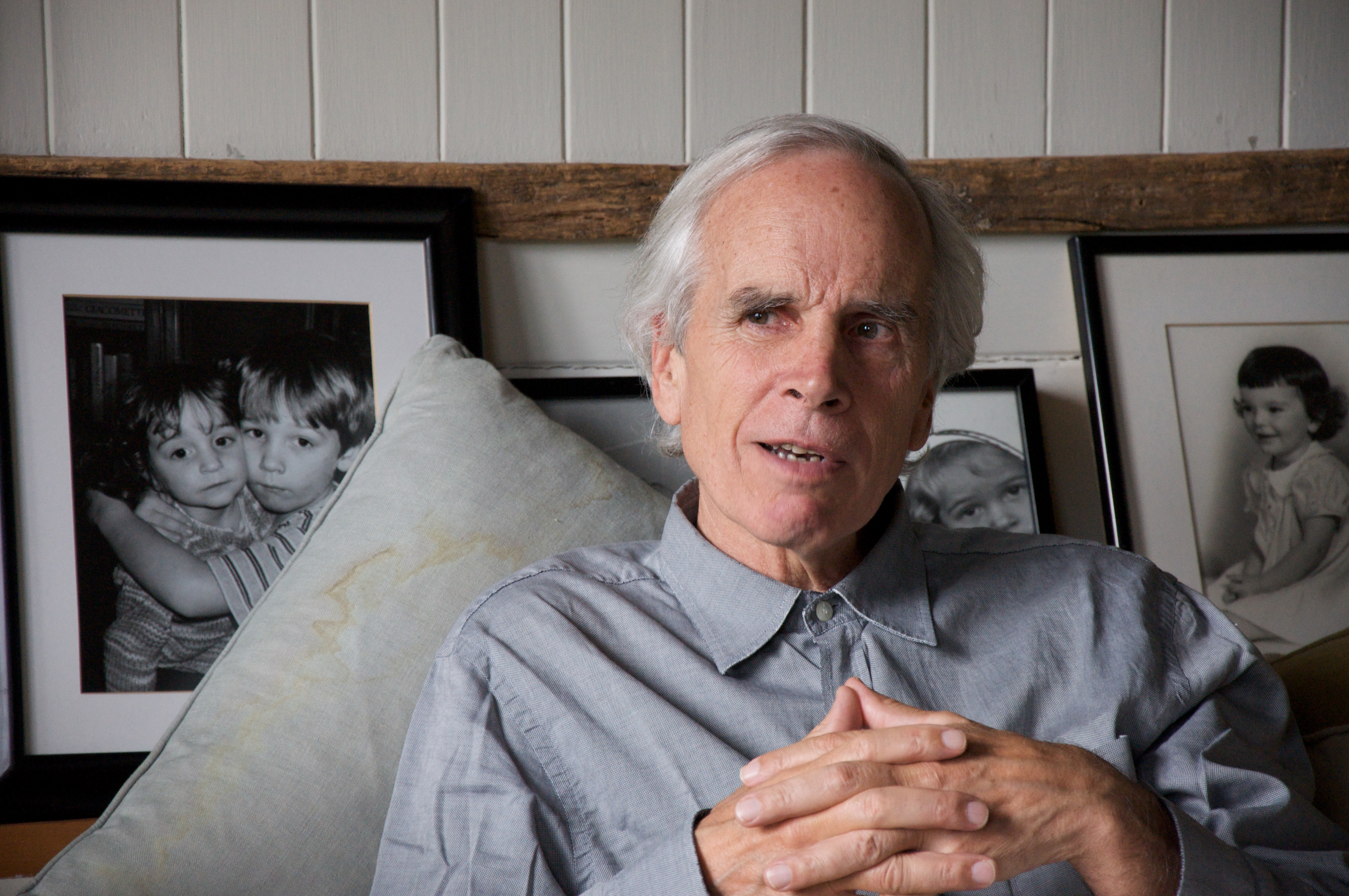
- Tompkins in 2009
- Born: Douglas Rainsford Tompkins; March 20, 1943; Conneaut, Ohio, U.S.
- Died: December 8, 2015 (aged 72); Coyhaique, Chile
- Occupations: businessman, conservationist
- Known for: North Face, Esprit, Tompkins Conservation
- Spouses: Susie Russell (m. 1964; div. 1989) Kristine L. McDivitt (m. 1993)
- Children: 2
- Awards: New Species Award, Good Steward Award, David R. Brower Award
- Website: www.tompkinsconservation.org

Douglas Rainsford Tompkins (March 20, 1943 – December 8, 2015) was an American businessman, conservationist, outdoorsman, philanthropist, filmmaker, and agriculturalist. He founded the North Face Inc., co-founded Esprit and various environmental groups, including the Foundation for Deep Ecology and Tompkins Conservation.

Beginning in the mid-1960s, he and Susie Tompkins Buell (née Russell), his first wife, co-founded and ran two companies: the outdoor equipment and clothing company The North Face and the Esprit clothing company. Following their divorce and Tompkins' departure from the business world in 1989, he became active in environmental and land conservation causes. In the 1990s Tompkins and his second wife, Kris McDivitt Tompkins, bought and conserved more than 2 million acres (810,000 ha) of wilderness in Chile, exceeding that of any other private individuals in the region, thus becoming among the largest private land-owners in the world. The Tompkinses were focused on park creation, wildlife recovery, ecological agriculture, and activism, with the goal of saving biodiversity.

He had assembled and preserved the land which became the largest gift of private land to any South American government. Due to this, he was posthumously naturalized Chilean.

== Early life ==
Tompkins was born in Conneaut, Ohio, on March 20, 1943, the son of an antiques dealer and decorator. He spent the first few years of his life in New York City before his family moved to Millbrook, New York. He graduated from Indian Mountain School, a pre-prep school in Lakeville, Connecticut, in 1957. In his senior year at Pomfret School in Connecticut, Tompkins was expelled for various minor infractions. He returned to his hometown in Millbrook, but did not graduate from high school.

Tompkins spent the years between 1960 and 1962 ski racing and rock climbing in Colorado, Europe, and South America. In 1963, Tompkins founded the California Mountaineering Guide Service. It was during this time he met Susie Russell, a casino employee who gave him a lift while hitch-hiking to Lake Tahoe. They married in 1964 in San Francisco.

== The North Face, Inc. ==
In 1964, Tompkins borrowed $5,000 from a bank to found The North Face, Inc., in San Francisco, as a mail order and retail company, selling rock climbing and camping equipment. The early years set the design standard of sleeping bags, backpacks, and mountaineering tents. Tompkins designed tents that were some of the first to avoid a pole in the middle, by using bendable rods threaded through exterior sleeves instead. This design also increased the strength of the tent because the domed shape allowed the wind to roll over it. These tents have been widely copied throughout the world. In 1966, the first The North Face store was opened; the band The Grateful Dead played at the grand opening. Two years later, Tompkins sold out his stake to Kenneth "Hap" Klopp for $50,000, using the profit to join his wife in co-founding Esprit, a fashion house. Tompkins sold The North Face with the intention of a focus on adventure film making.

== Adventure filmmaking - Mountain of Storms ==
In 1968, Tompkins headed off on a six-month road-adventure trip from California to Patagonia, along with Yvon Chouinard, Dick Dorworth, and Chris Jones (calling themselves the "Fun Hogs"), who made the third ascent of Mount Fitz Roy in Patagonia in 1968. They put up a new route on Mount Fitzroy, and - together with filmmaker Lito Tejada-Flores, who also made the ascent - made an adventure film, Mountain of Storms, about their experience. The 2010 film 180 Degrees South: Conquerors of the Useless describes a modern-day recreation of this journey and also highlights the conservation work on which Tompkins had been working.

Tompkins also became a skilled whitewater kayaker, claiming first descents of rivers in California, Africa, and South America. In addition, he was a skilled bush pilot.

== Esprit ==
In 1968, Tompkins, his wife Susie, and her friend Jane Tise began selling girls dresses, which they had planned on the kitchen table, out of the back of a VW bus. In 1971 they incorporated the booming business under the name "Plain Jane", which later became Esprit. By 1978, sales topped $100 million a year and the company had formed partnerships in Germany and Hong Kong. Tompkins appointed himself "image director", developing his own marketing approach: overseeing all aspects of the company's image, from store design to catalogue layout, while his wife served as design director.

Emerging as one of the hottest brands of the era, the company grew into a transnational company operating in 60 countries. In 1989, the Japanese art publisher Robundo published Esprit, the Comprehensive Design Principle (ISBN 4947613203), which documented the all-encompassing design principles that Tompkins had created for the brand.

Growing increasingly concerned about the ecological impacts of the fashion industry, Tompkins decided to leave the business world in the late 1980s. In 1989, he sold his share of the American company back to Susie, from whom he had separated, putting most of his profits into land conservation. Subsequently, in 1989 and 1994, he sold his interests in the other Esprit entities around the world.

== Land conservation - Tompkins Conservation ==
After selling his interest in Esprit, Tompkins turned his efforts toward southern Chile, where he had spent much time climbing, kayaking, and skiing, to focus on land conservation and environmental activism. He founded the Foundation for Deep Ecology in 1990, which supports environmental activism (see deep ecology), and The Conservation Land Trust in 1992, now called Tompkins Conservation, which works to protect wildlands, primarily in Chile and Argentina.

In November 1994, he married Kristine McDivitt, a former chief executive of Patagonia

=== Pumalín Park ===
Tompkins's first major conservation project was Pumalín Park in the Palena Province of Chile, an 800,000-acre (320,000 ha) area of Valdivian temperate rain forest, high peaks, lakes, and rivers. In 1991 he bought the Reñihué farm, a semi-abandoned farm at the end of the Reñihué Fjord, planning to set aside 42,000 acres (17,000 ha) of this unique forest from possible exploitation. In the next decade, The Conservation Land Trust added another 700,000 acres (280,000 ha) in nearly contiguous parcels to create Pumalín Park, which eventually stretched from the Corcovado Gulf to the Andes mountains, over an area of 800,000 acres.

In 2005, then-president Ricardo Lagos declared this area a Nature Sanctuary, a special designation of the Chilean state, granting it additional environmental and non-developmental protection. The Conservation Land Trust (a U.S. environmental foundation) donated these protected lands to Fundación Pumalín (a Chilean foundation), for their administration and continual development as a type of National Park with public access under a private initiative. Through creating public-access infrastructure, including trails, campgrounds, visitor centers, and a restaurant, Tompkins sought to promote wilderness experience, in hopes of inspiring a deeper environmental ethic in the park's many thousands of visitors.

In March 2018, the Chilean president Michelle Bachelet announced that the government was accepting the gift of 1 million acres from Tompkins Conservation and creating five new national parks and expanding three more, covering 11 million acres in all, the largest private land donation in history. At a ceremony for signing of the accord between government and the foundation, Tompkins' long-term friend Yvon Chouinard claimed that “No other human has ever created this many acres of protected wildlands".

=== Corcovado National Park ===
Just to the south of Pumalin, Corcovado National Park represents one of Tompkins's completed conservation projects. In 1994, The Conservation Land Trust (CLT), along with U.S. philanthropist Peter Buckley, acquired 208,000 acres (84,000 ha) of native forest that was slated for logging, adjacent to vast areas of federal land under the jurisdiction of the Chilean Armed Forces. CLT offered to donate this parcel back to the Chilean state, provided that the whole area became a national park. In 2005, then-president Ricardo Lagos accepted this proposal, and the 726,000-acre (294,000 ha) Corcovado National Park was born.

=== Iberá National Park ===
The Iberá project was a private conservation enterprise that was spearheaded by Tompkins, working with George Soros, Harvard University, and Rewilding Argentina. Its goal was to strengthen protection and restore habitat and biodiversity in the Iberá Wetlands in Corrientes Province, Argentina.

Iberá Provincial Reserve, established in 1983, encompasses 1,300,000 ha of wetlands, grasslands, forest, and rangelands, including both publicly-owned lands and private cattle ranches. The Iberá project advocated for enhanced protection of government-owned floodplain lands, and in 2009 the provincial government created Iberá Provincial Park on 553,000 hectares of public land in the reserve.

Led by Tompkins, the Conservation Land Trust acquired 150,000 hectares of old cattle ranches bordering the provincial park, including habitats not then represented in the park. Most cattle and internal fences were removed, and a land management program was developed to restore native vegetation and habitat. In December 2015 the Trust donated these lands, including espinal, malezal grasslands, and forests, to the Argentine government to create a strictly-conserved national park to be called Iberá National Park. The proposed park, which would total 700,000 hectares, would be the largest national park in Argentina and home to hundreds of bird species, giant anteaters, and macaw parrots. It would provide safe habitat for a range of native species, and encourage a transition from "an exploitative economy" to "an economy of conservation and ecotourism". In 2018 the Argentine government created Iberá National Park from the donated lands, while the provincial park is administered separately.

In 2007 the Conservation Land Trust established a rewilding program to reintroduce native species which had been extirpated from the wetlands during the 20th century. Giant anteater (Myrmecophaga tridactyla), collared peccary (Peccary tajacu), South American tapir (Tapirus terrestris), pampas deer (Ozotoceros bezoarticus), and red-and-green macaw (Ara chloropterus) have been reintroduced to the wild, and a captive breeding program for jaguars (Panthera onca) was created to support reintroduction of jaguars to the parks.

=== Other conservation projects ===
Other conservation projects that Tompkins spearheaded include:

- The Melimoyu and Isla Magdalena conservation projects in coastal Chile, 200 km and 300 km respectively south of Pumalín Park
- The Yendegaia project in Chile's Tierra del Fuego
- Patagonia Park, formerly known as Estancia Valle Chacabuco, 30 minutes north of Cochrane, Chile and 800 km south of Pumalín Park

== Organic agriculture ==
Envisioning "conservation as a consequence of production," Tompkins developed models of sustainable organic farming, which maintain soil health and ecological integrity at the same time that they provide for families and support the local economy.

In the area around Pumalin, the Hornopiren, Vodudahue, Ventisquero, Pillan, and Reñihué farms serve as exemplars of small-scale ecological agriculture and as informal park ranger stations. Each of these farms produces a variety of products, including sheep, cattle, honey, berries, and organic vegetables. A small facility in the Pillan farm processes honey and berries for jams, which are sold under the name Pillan Organics.

In northeastern Argentina, Tompkins managed cattle ranches in Corrientes Province and polyculture grain and fruit farms in Entre Ríos Province. Each farm pays close attention to developing sustainable practices.

== Environmental activism ==
Through the Foundation for Deep Ecology, Tompkins published a series of large-format, activist photograph books on environmental issues, including:

- Clearcut: The Tragedy of Industrial Forestry (ed. Bill Devall, 1993, ISBN 0871564947)
- Fatal Harvest: The Tragedy of Industrial Agriculture (ed. Andrew Kimbrell, 2002, ISBN 1559639407)
- Welfare Ranching: The Subsidized Destruction of the American West (eds. George Weurthner and Mollie Yoneko Madison, 2002, ISBN 1559639423)
- Wildfire: A Century of Failed Forest Policy (ed. George Weurthner, 2006, ISBN 159726069X)

In addition, The Foundation for Deep Ecology had a long history as a grant-maker in categories such as Biodiversity and Wilderness, Ecological Agriculture, and Megatechnology and Economic Globalization, although in-house publishing is now its main focus.

Tompkins also was involved in several large environmental campaigns in Chile and Argentina, such as the "Patagonia Sin Represas" campaign, which opposed the construction of dams on two of the largest and wildest rivers in the Patagonia region of Chile.

== Honors ==
Tompkins' environmental work won him respect and accolades outside of South America: in 2012, the African Rainforest Conservancy awarded Tompkins and his wife its "New Species Award"; in 2007, the International Conservation Caucus Foundation awarded its "Good Steward" award to him and his wife, Kris; in 2008, the American Alpine Club awarded him the David R. Brower Award, for his work preserving mountain regions; in 2009, Latin Trade named him the "Environmental Leader of the Year".

In 2007, he was appointed as an honorary member of the American Society of Landscape Architects, in recognition of his work restoring damaged landscapes. Eco Barons, Edward Humes' 2009 account of the "dreamers, schemers, and millionaires who are saving our planet," uses Tompkins as the first example of this new group of philanthropists.

In Brazil, the environmentalist Douglas Tompkins was specially honored during the celebrations of 30 years of the Society for the Protection of Wildlife with the video “A Natureza do Brasil” with images of Haroldo Pallo Júnior and the Brazilian pianist Salete Chiamulera.

== Death ==
On December 8, 2015, Tompkins was kayaking with five others (including Patagonia, Inc. founder Yvon Chouinard) on General Carrera Lake in southern Chile when strong waves caused their kayaks to capsize. Tompkins spent a "considerable amount of time", almost two hours, in 40 °F (4 °C) waters.

He was flown by helicopter to a hospital in nearby Coyhaique, where he died hours later from severe hypothermia. His core body temperature was 66 °F, 32 degrees lower than normal. He was 72 years old and was survived by his second wife, Kristine (McDivitt), two daughters, his brother and his mother.

Tompkins is buried at a small cemetery near the Lodge at Valle Chacabuco in Parque Patagonia.

== See also ==
- Wild Life – 2023 film by Chai Vasarhelyi and Jimmy Chin
