= Kris Tompkins =

American conservationist (born 1950)

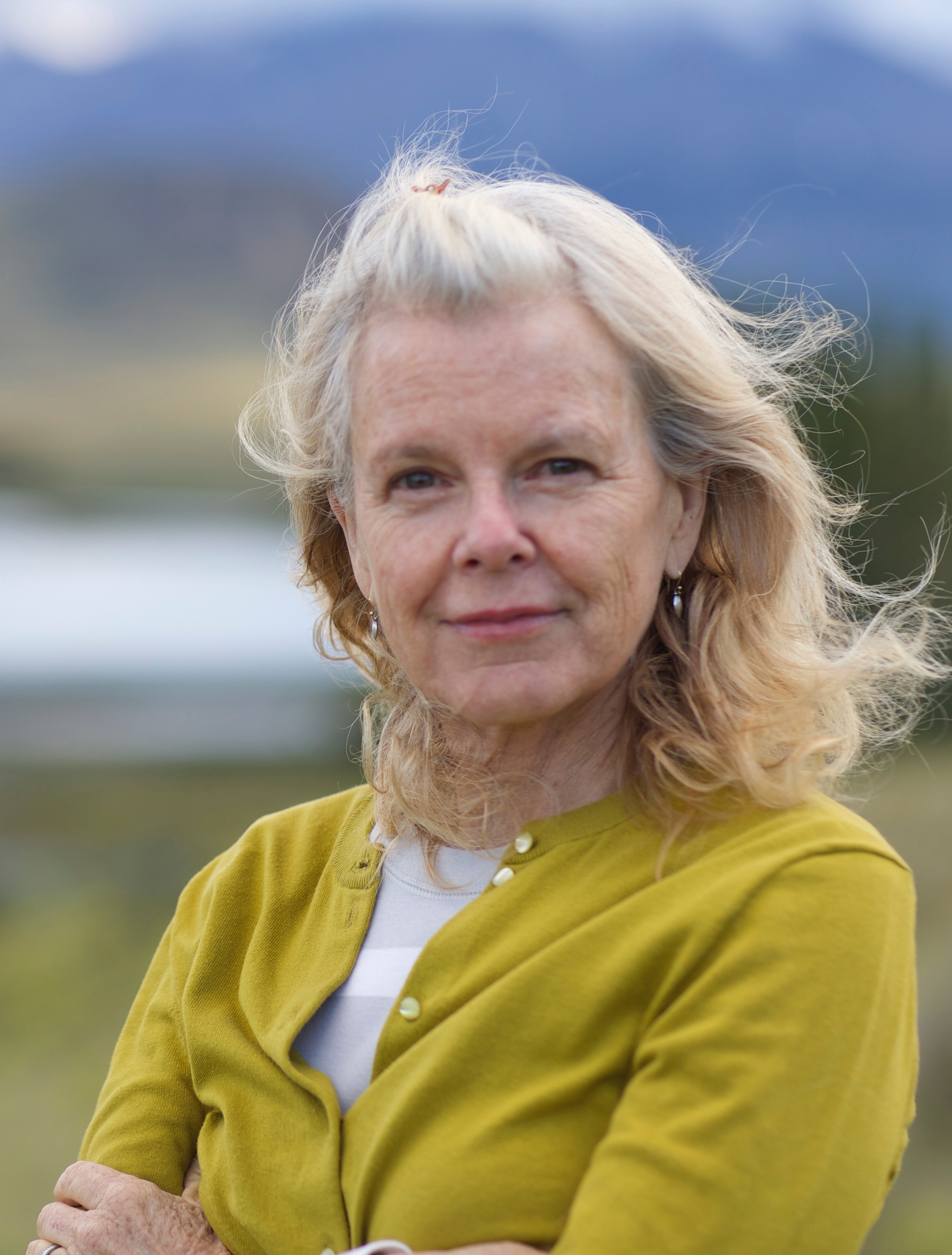
- Tompkins in 2015
- Born: Kristine McDivitt; June 1950 (age 76); Santa Paula, California, U.S.
- Occupations: Conservationist, businesswoman
- Organization(s): Patagonia, Tompkins Conservation
- Spouse: Doug Tompkins (m. 1993; died 2015)
- Website: tompkinsconservation.org

Kristine "Kris" Tompkins (née McDivitt) (born June 1950) is an American conservationist. Tompkins is the president and co-founder of Tompkins Conservation and was CEO of Patagonia for 20 years, leaving the company in 1993.

== Early life ==
Born Kristine McDivitt in Southern California, Tompkins spent much of her childhood on her great-grandfather's ranch. She lived in Venezuela during her early years while her father worked for an oil company. As a teenager, she met and befriended Yvon Chouinard in the Ventura County surf scene. She later studied at the College of Idaho in Caldwell, where she competed in ski-racing.

== At Patagonia, Inc. ==
In 1973, Tompkins returned to California and began working for Yvon Chouinard, assisting him in transforming his small piton business into Patagonia, Inc., eventually becoming the company's first CEO, a position she held until her retirement in 1993.

== Conservation work ==
In 1993, Tompkins retired from Patagonia and married Doug Tompkins, founder of The North Face clothing company and co-founder of Esprit. The Tompkinses moved to Chile and focused on preserving national parks, establishing several nonprofit organizations, including the Conservation Land Trust, The Foundation For Deep Ecology, and Conservación Patagónica, which have now consolidated under Tompkins Conservation. In 1991, Doug Tompkins began acquiring private land for conservation in Chile's Los Lagos, managing it as a public-access park within the threatened Valdivian temperate rainforest. Pumalín Park received official nature sanctuary status in 2005 and became a national park in 2018. This designation followed Tompkins Conservation's donation of nearly 725,000 acres to help establish the new park, Pumalin Douglas Tompkins National Park, covering approximately 1 million acres and named in honor of its founder.

The Tompkinses' conservation efforts expanded to Argentina, starting with the Iberá Wetlands of the Corrientes. In the wetland ecosystem, they launched projects to reintroduce extirpated species, such as the giant anteater, jaguar, red-and-green macaw, and giant river otter. The rewilding work in Ibera, and many other projects in the country, is now carried out by Rewilding Argentina, the team assembled by Kris and Doug, led by Sofia Heinonen.

In January 2018, Tompkins and Chilean President Michelle Bachelet signed decrees on behalf of Tompkins Conservation to create five new national parks in Chile and expand three others, adding a total of 10.3 million acres of new national parklands to Chile. One million acres of land came from Tompkins Conservation, with the Chilean government providing the rest in federally controlled land. At the time, it was reported as the largest donation of land from a private entity to a country in South America.

== Recognition ==
=== Awards ===
- 2026 The Explorers Club Medal from The Explorers Club
- 2025 Ellis Island Medal of Honor
- 2023 Ohana Festival's Inspiring Activism Award
- 2023 Ken Burns American Heritage Prize
- 2022 Senckenberg Prize for Commitment to Nature
- 2021 Inducted to the Kyoto Earth Hall of Fame
- 2018 Designated the UN Environment Patron of Protected Areas
- 2018 Luis Oyarzún Award granted by the Universidad Austral de Chile
- 2017 Woodrow Wilson Award for Corporate Citizenship granted by the Woodrow Wilson Center
- 2017 Carnegie Medal of Philanthropy
- 2017 Cynthia Pratt Laughlin Medal granted by the Garden Club of America
- 2017 David R. Brower Award granted by the American Alpine Club

== See also ==
- Wild Life – 2023 film by Chai Vasarhelyi and Jimmy Chin
- Conservación Patagónica
