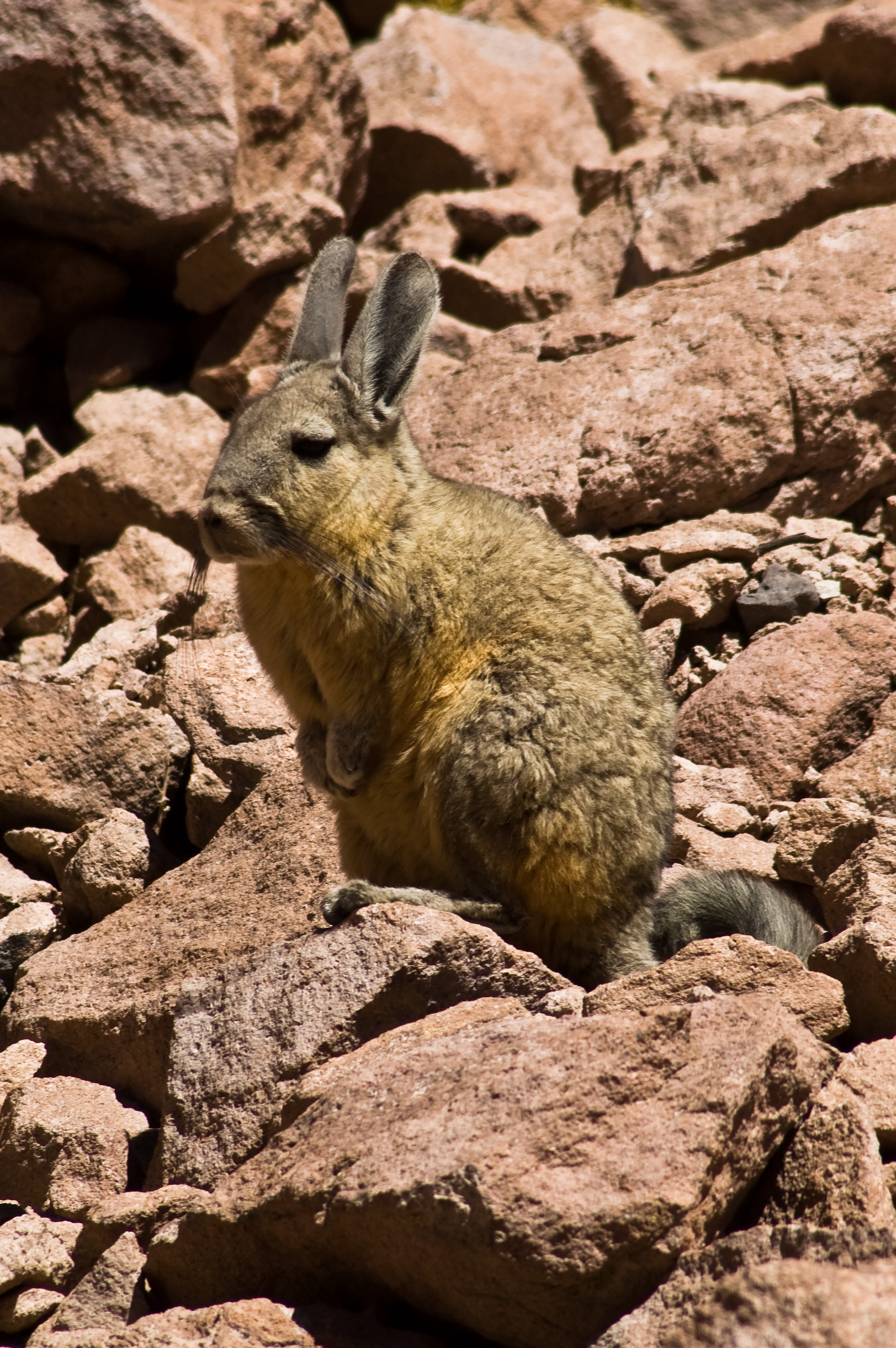
- A southern viscacha in the Atacama Desert, Chile

Scientific classification
- Kingdom: Animalia
- Phylum: Chordata
- Class: Mammalia
- Infraclass: Placentalia
- Order: Rodentia
- Superfamily: Chinchilloidea
- Family: Chinchillidae

Groups included
- Lagidium Meyen, 1833; Lagostomus Brookes, 1828

Cladistically included but traditionally excluded taxa
- †Eoviscaccia; Chinchilla Bennett, 1829; †Pliolagostomus; †Prolagostomus

= Viscacha =

Group of rodents

Viscacha or vizcacha (UK: /vɪˈskætʃə/, US: /vɪˈskɑːtʃə/) are rodents of two genera (Lagidium and Lagostomus) in the family Chinchillidae. They are native to South America and convergently resemble rabbits.

The five extant species of viscacha are:

- The Plains viscacha (Lagostomus maximus), a resident of the Pampas of Argentina, is easily differentiated from other viscachas by black and gray mustache-like facial markings. This species lives colonially in warrens of 10 to over 100. It is very vocal and emits alarm calls. The plains viscacha can strip grassland used to graze livestock; this has caused ranchers to consider the rodent a pest species.
- Lagidium ahuacaense is a newly described species of mountain viscacha from the Ecuadorian Andes.
- The northern viscacha (Lagidium peruanum) is native to the Peruvian Andes at elevations between the tree line and the snow line. It is dorsally gray or brown in color, with a bushy tail and long, furry ears. This species lives in large colonies separated into individual family units, like an apartment complex. It eats a wide range of plant matter, settling for almost anything it can find growing in the harsh, rocky environment.
- The southern viscacha (Lagidium viscacia), also called mountain viscacha, is similar to the northern viscacha, but its pelage is more red in color. It lives in similar habitat in the Andes.
- Wolffsohn's viscacha (Lagidium wolffsohni) is rarer than the other four species. It occurs in southwestern Argentina and adjacent Chile.
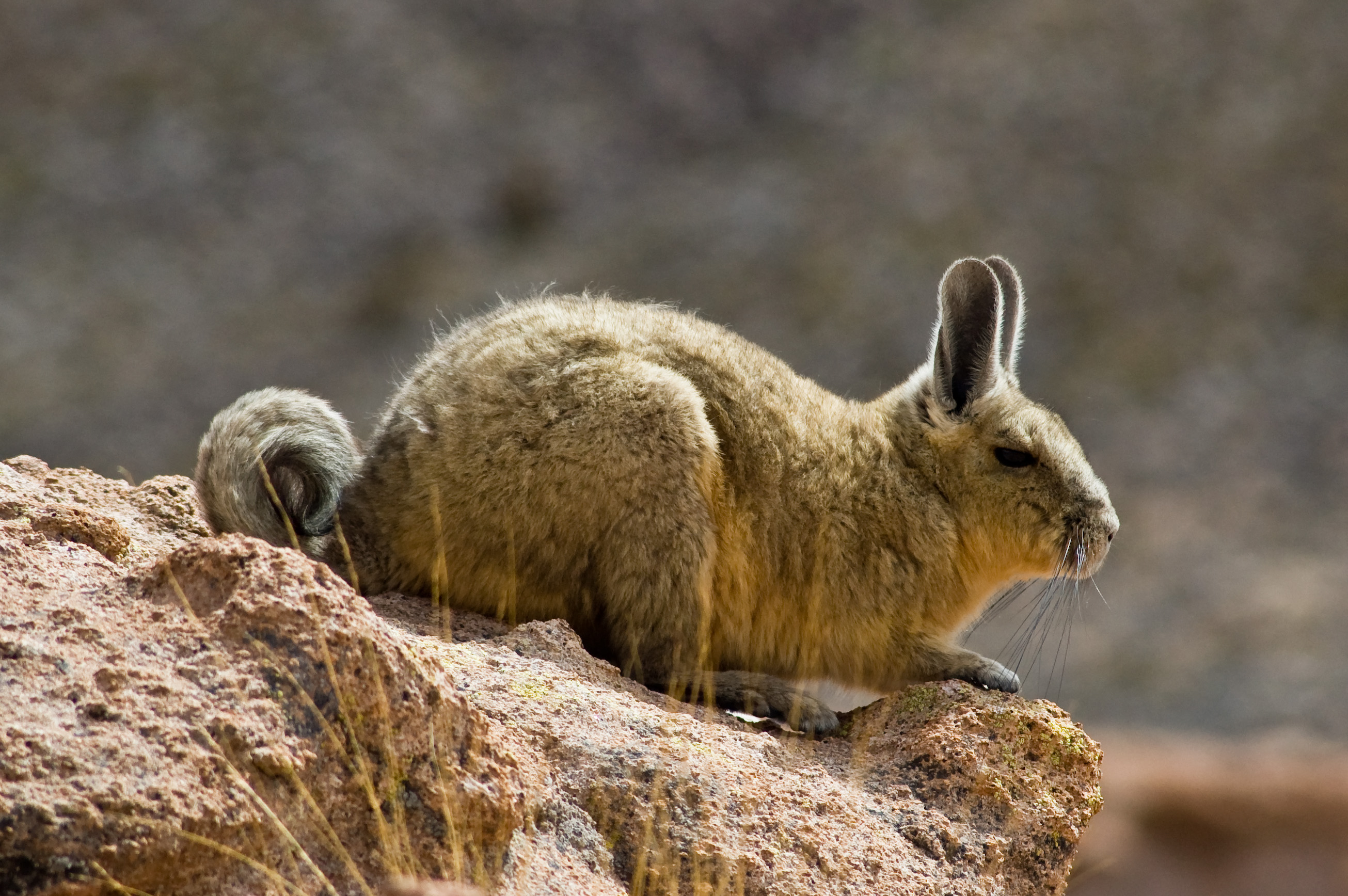
A southern viscacha in the Sur Lípez desert, Bolivia

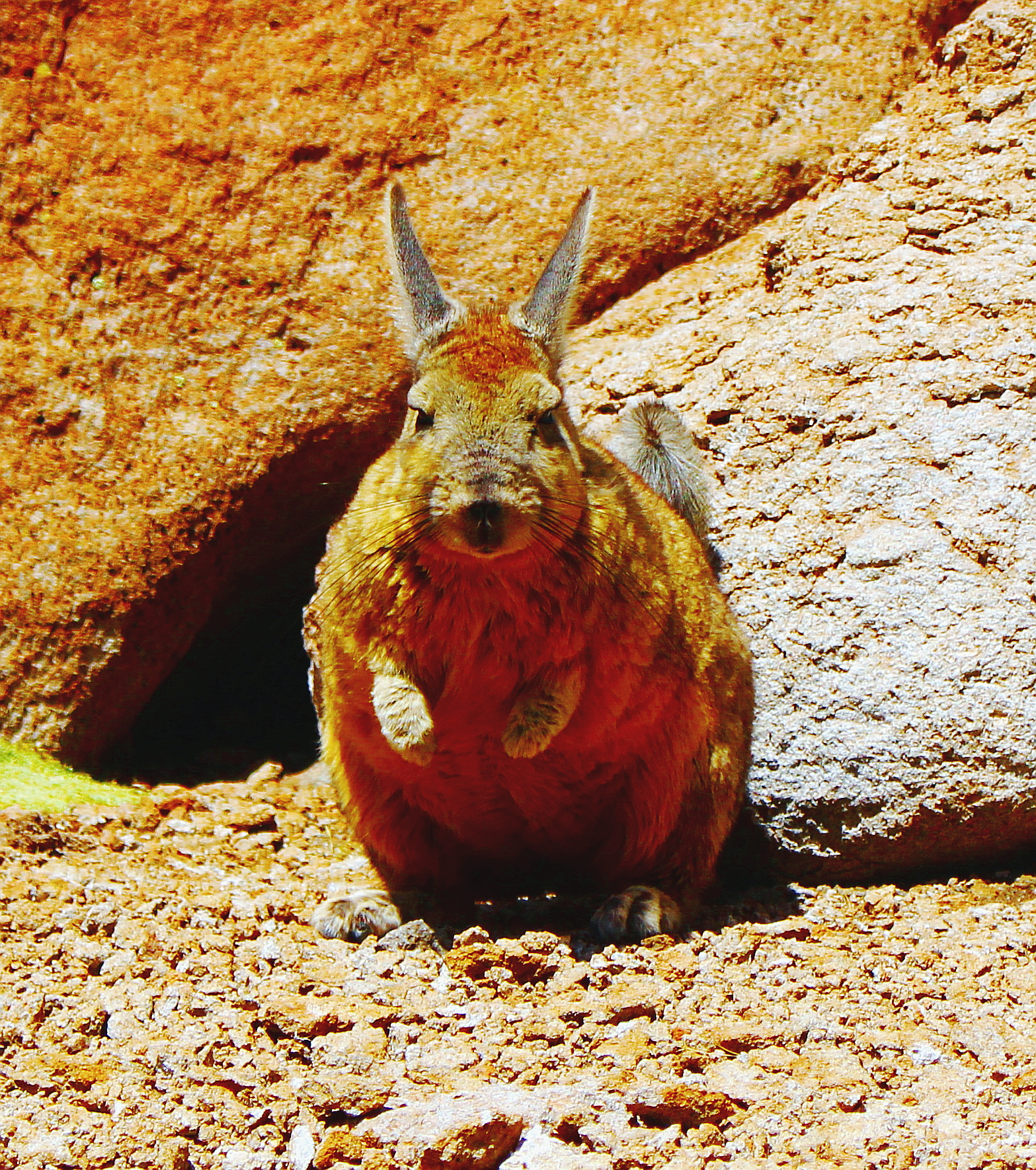
Viscacha near Salar de Uyuni, 2017

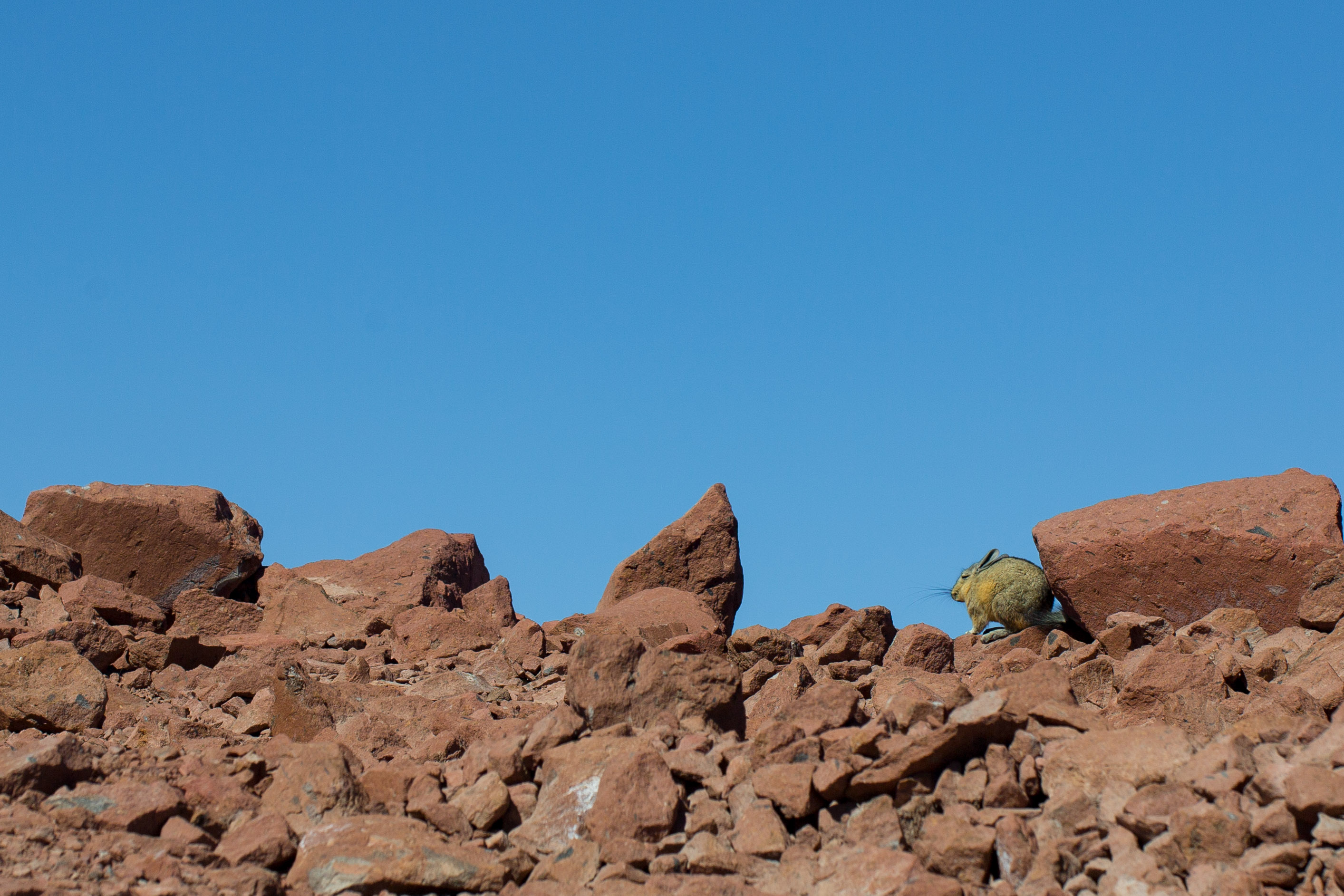
A viscacha warms itself in the morning sun in the Andes mountains in Chile.
