= Rewilding Argentina =

Argentine conservation organization

- Fundación Rewilding Argentina
- Formation: 2010; 16 years ago
- Type: Nonprofit
- Location: Argentina
- Fields: Species reintroduction, rewilding
- Executive director: Sofía Heinonen

Rewilding Argentina (Spanish: Fundación Rewilding Argentina) is an Argentine nonprofit conservation organization. It purchases private land, restoring ecosystems and developing wildlife corridors, then donates the land for national parks. The organization also reintroduces native species. Founded in 2010 by Argentine conservationists, Rewilding Argentina was preceded by Conservation Land Trust, which was established by Doug Tompkins in 1992.

Rewilding Argentina has donated land that led to the creation or expansion of six national parks, two provincial parks, and one national reserve in Argentina. Among the parks expanded or created through Rewilding Argentina are Monte León National Park, El Impenetrable National Park, Perito Moreno National Park, Patagonia National Park, Aconquija National Park, Iberá National Park, Cueva de las Manos Provincial Park, and the Iberá Provincial Reserve.

Through its rewilding efforts, Rewilding Argentina manages reintroduction projects for 14 species, including giant river otters, giant anteaters, Pampas deer, lowland tapirs, collared peccaries, jaguars, red-and-green macaws, and bare-faced curassows. Rewilding Argentina also works with communities adjacent to national parks to establish ecotourism.

== Background and history ==
Since the European colonization of the Americas, Argentina has experienced massive biodiversity loss and defaunation related to pressures placed on the environment by overexploitation and cattle ranching. In northern Argentina, populations of giant anteaters, giant river otters, jaguars, red-and-green macaws, Pampas deer, pumas, and maned wolves dwindled or disappeared completely.

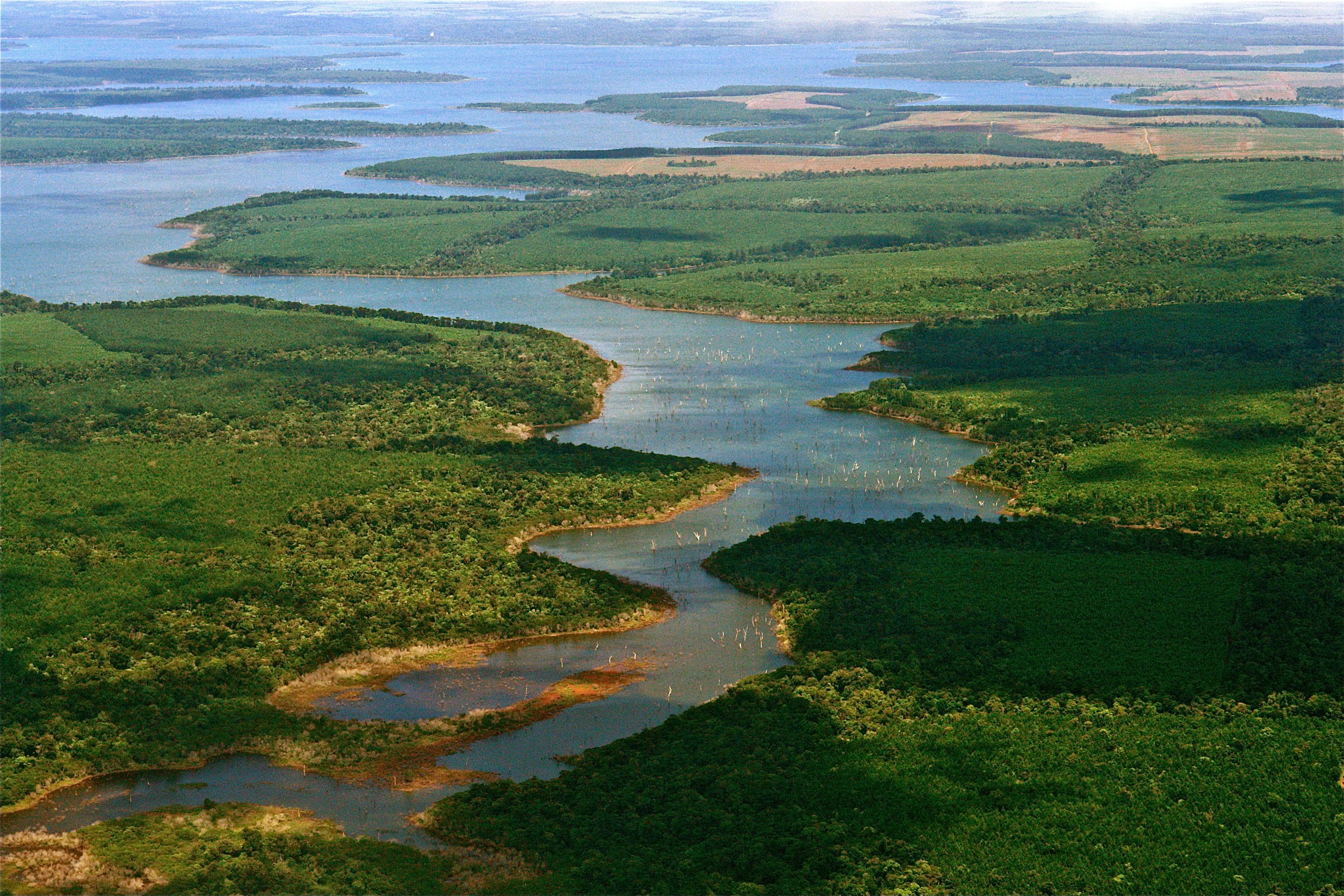
The Iberá Wetlands in northeast Argentina

Doug Tompkins, a U.S. businessperson and the founder of outdoor company The North Face, founded the Conservation Land Trust in 1992 and began purchasing large tracts of land that could be used to establish national parks. The donation of a parcel of land led to the formation of the Corcovado National Park in Chile in 1994. National park officials in Argentina invited Tompkins and his wife Kris Tompkins, former CEO of the outdoor company Patagonia, to visit the Iberá Wetlands in 1997. That year, Conservation Land Trust Argentina purchased the San Alonso Ranch, a 11,400 ha (28,000-acre) island in the wetlands.

In 2004, Conservation Land Trust donated land to the Argentine government that was later used to form the Monte León National Park in Santa Cruz Province. By 2007, Conservation Land Trust Argentina had acquired an additional 142,000 ha (350,000 acres) for restoration and conservation projects. Additional swamp land and former ranches were purchased, and by 2010, the organization had acquired 765,000 ha (1,890,000 acres) of land in Chile and Argentina.

Rewilding Argentina was founded in 2010 by Argentinian conservationists as a spin-off of the non-profit organization Tompkins Conservation, which serves as a project partner. The nonprofit organization purchases large tracts of privately owned land, restores them, then donates the land to the Argentine government, ensuring that the land is preserved as a national park. Argentine biologist Sofia Heinonen is the executive director of Rewilding Argentina.

== Establishment of national parks ==
The efforts of Rewilding Argentina and its counterpart in Chile have led to the establishment or enlargement of 15 national parks in Argentina and Chile, protecting 6,000,000 ha (15,000,000 acres). By 2022, the organization had donated $400 million to conservation efforts and had donated around 400,000 ha (990,000 acres) of land, with "an estimated market value of US$91 million". In Argentina, the organization's land donations have resulted in the enlargement and creation of six national parks, two provincial parks, and one national reserve. The lands comprise over 10% of the land managed by the National Parks Administration of Argentina.

By 2003, Doug Tompkins had acquired 110,074 ha (272,000 acres) of land in the Iberá wetlands. Rewilding Argentina purchased several private ranches in the wetlands and managed them as private reserves, eradicating non-native species, creating wildlife corridors, removing hundreds of kilometers of fences, and implementing prescribed burns. Rewilding Argentina worked with the Corrientes government to elevate the legal status of the provincial reserve to a provincial park in 2009, ensuring that the land could not be sold by the government.

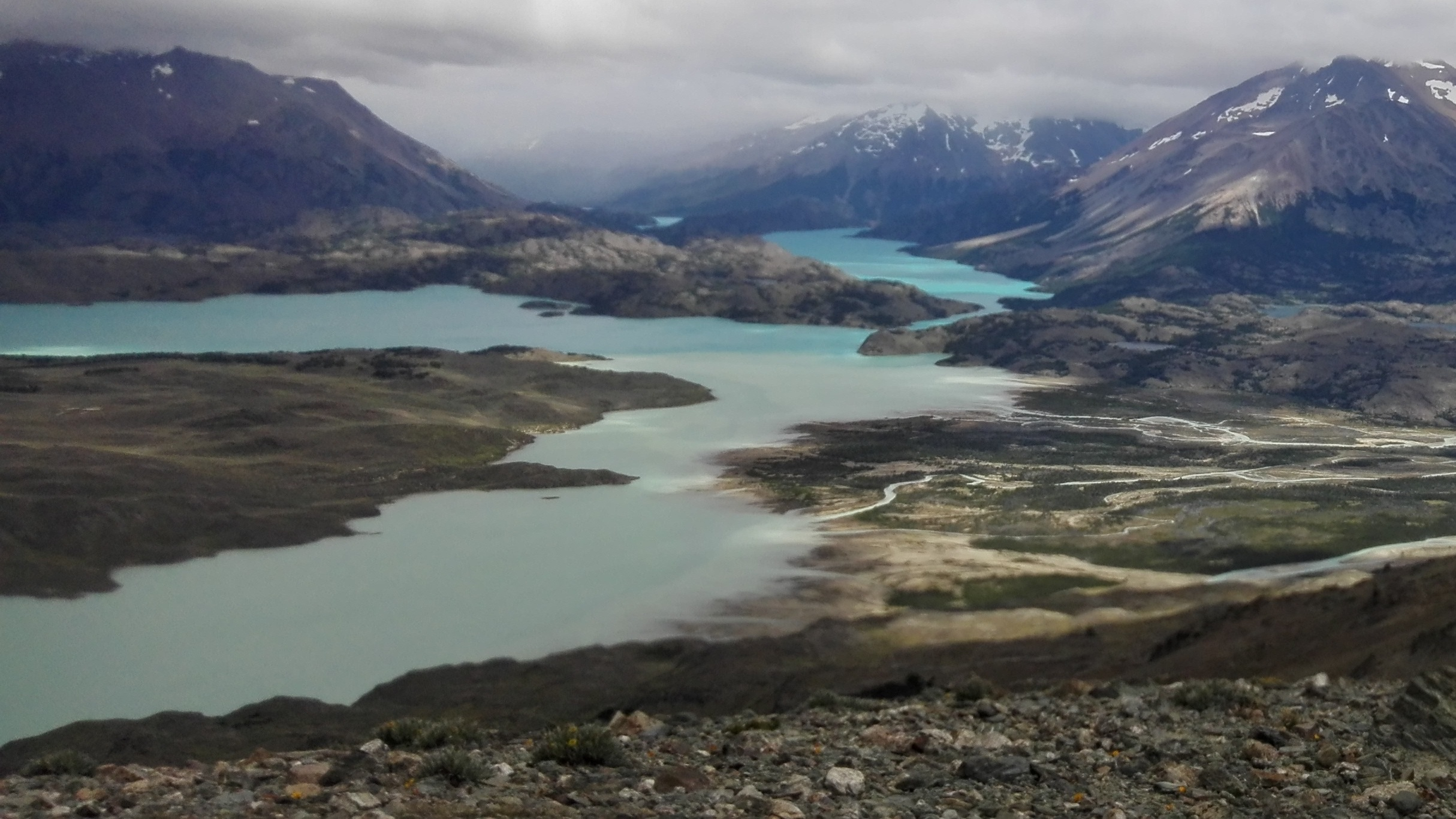
The donation of a 37,500-acre (15,200 ha) tract of land led to the expansion of the Perito Moreno National Park.

The donation of the 37,500-acre (15,200 ha) El Rincón Ranch in Santa Cruz Province in 2013 enlarged the size of Perito Moreno National Park. The creation of the 128,000 ha (320,000-acre) El Impenetrable National Park in 2014 was made possible through the donation of La Fidelidad Ranch. In 2015, Rewilding Argentina donated land that led to the establishment of Patagonia National Park in Santa Cruz Province. In 2018, the organization donated land that became the Aconquija National Park in Tucumán Province. In 2018, 151,757 ha (375,000 acres) of land was donated to the Argentine government and the Iberá National Park was created. The Cambyretá Wild Nature Reserve was established in 2019. In 2019, Rewilding Argentina donated land for the creation of the Cueva de las Manos Provincial Park, which contains the rock art site Cueva de las Manos in Santa Cruz Province. In 2021, Rewilding Argentina donated over 50,000 ha (120,000 acres) to increase the size of the Iberá Provincial Reserve.

Rewilding Argentina also assisted in the passage of legislation in Argentina that led to the creation of two national marine reserves, the Yaganes Marine National Park and the Namuncurá-Burdwood Bank II Marine National Park.

In 2022, Rewilding Argentina was part of a coalition that created the Península Mitre Natural Protected Area in Mitre Peninsula that complements the Tierra del Fuego National Park.

== Rewilding and species reintroduction ==
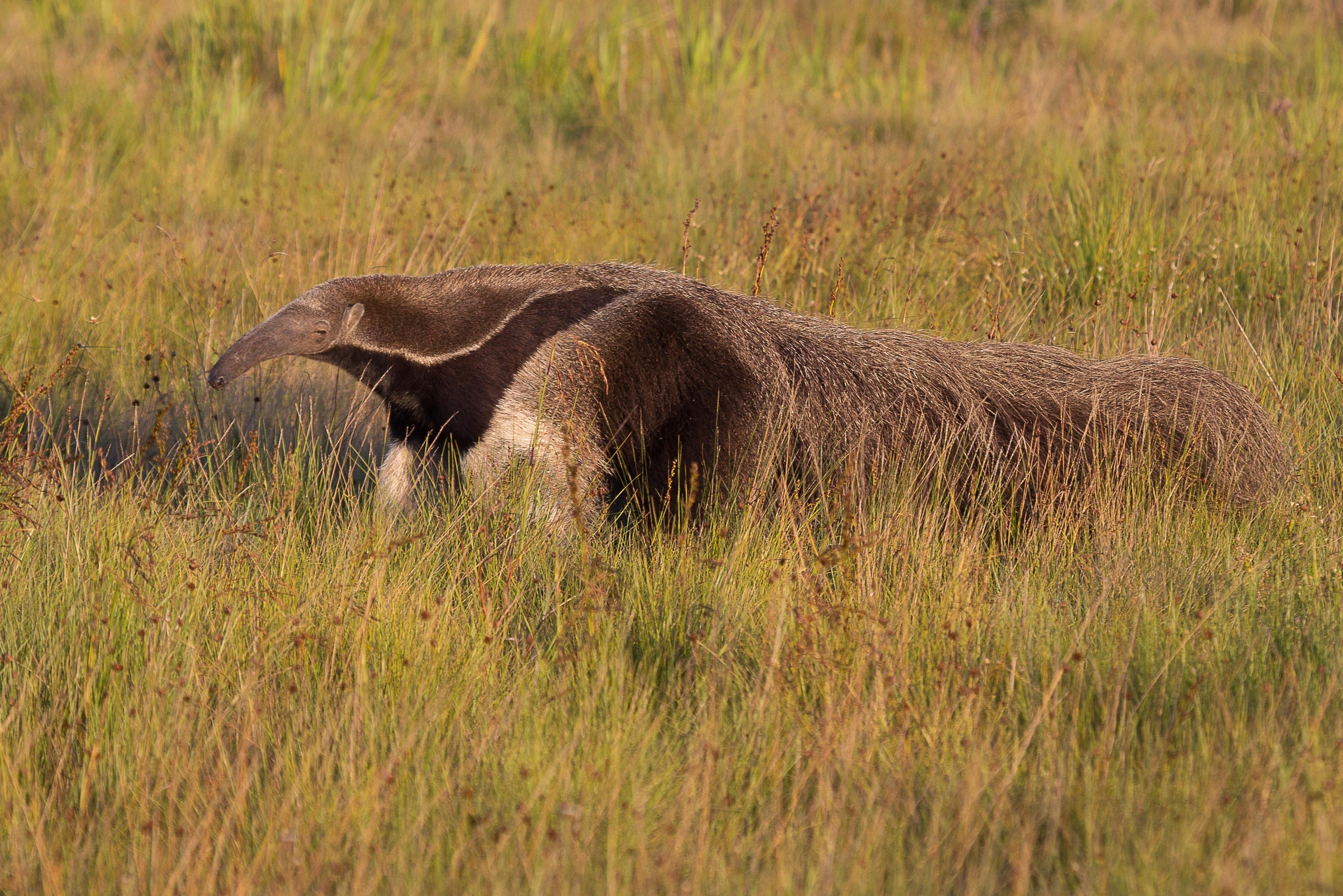
Giant anteaters were reintroduced to the Iberá wetlands in 2007.

In addition to habitat restoration, Rewilding Argentina manages multispecies rewilding projects throughout Argentina, including in the Iberá wetlands, the forests of Chaco, the southern coast, and the Patagonian Steppe. The organization spends US$3 million annually on nature restoration.

Rewilding Argentina emphasizes the reintroduction of keystone species, including large predators, to restore ecosystem function through trophic cascading. Many large vertebrates in Argentina, such as giant anteaters, lowland tapirs, giant river otters, jaguars, and peccaries were mostly hunted to extinction. Rewilding Argentina acquires animals from wildlife shelters and zoos. It implements quarantine protocols and captive breeding programs, eventually releasing the animals into reserves. Rewilding Argentina makes use of camera traps and satellite collars to monitor the reintroduced species and to document animal presence and predator-prey dynamics. For pumas, the rewilding teams engage in "capture campaigns" to find and capture the animals. Once fitted with GPS collars, the pumas are tracked using the Iridium satellite constellation.

Rewilding Argentina has introduced giant anteaters, pampas deer, and collared peccaries. Collared peccaries were reintroduced in 2015 and the lowland tapir was reintroduced the following year. As of 2022, the organization has projects focused on reintroducing 14 distinct species, including founding populations of bare-faced curassows, red-and-green macaws, coypus, Wolffsohn's viscachas, and jaguars. Rewilding Argentina has developed a model for reintroducing keystone species it calls the Full Nature Model, which was formalized by Ignacio Jiménez Pérez in 2018.

The rewilding team of the Conservation Land Trust reintroduced giant anteaters to the Iberá wetlands in 2007. A giant anteater named Yvoty Porá (Guarani: Pretty Flower) was the first reintroduced species in Corrientes. The anteater had been orphaned due to wildlife trafficking and had been living on the patio of a home in Palpalá, Jujuy. Following her release she had seven offspring and lived to the age of 15. By 2022, there were hundreds of giant anteaters in five population centers across Iberá. Two of the populations are self-sustaining.

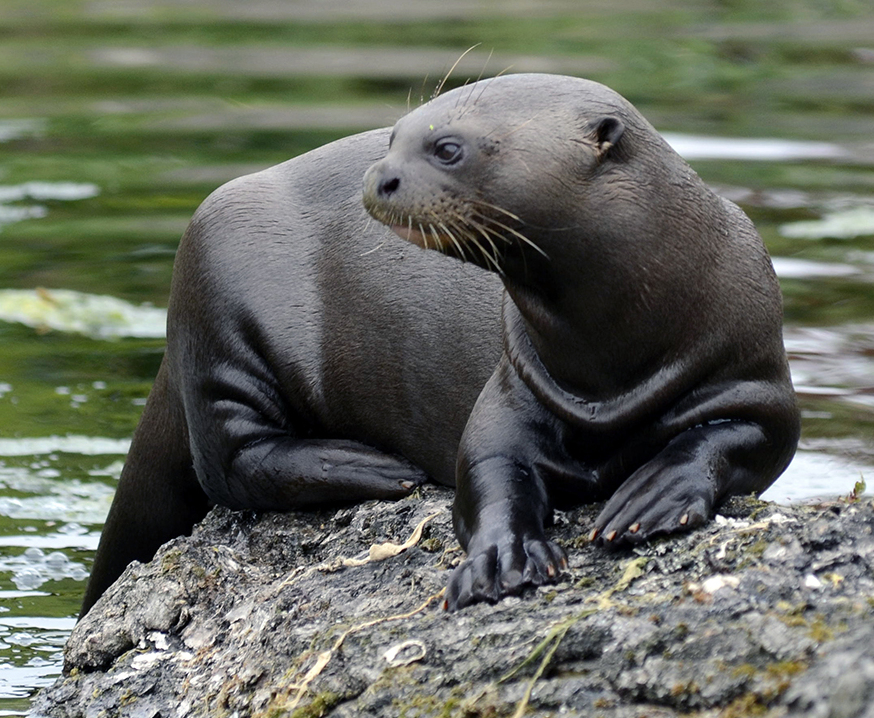
Giant river otters were reintroduced to the Iberá wetlands in 2021.

Rewilding Argentina has reintroduced giant river otters sourced from European zoos. Three giant river otter cubs were born in the Iberá wetlands in May 2021.

Pampas deer were translocated from the northern portion of the Iberá Provincial Reserve from 2009 to 2012 and from 2015 and 2019. They were reintroduced following a period of acclimatization and two self-sustaining populations now exist in Iberá.

The reintroduction of red-and-green macaws involved the construction of an aviary that has a stuffed, remote-controlled fox to help the birds learn to not feed on the ground. Only one of the seven birds that were initially released in 2015 survived, likely due to poor antipredation skills. Following improved training techniques, an additional 43 macaws were released between 2016 and 2022. Reintroduction efforts involved planting 100 pindó palms (Syagrus romanzoffiana) as food sources for the macaws. Pre-release aviaries were also constructed for bare-faced curassows and nine individuals were reintroduced in 2020.

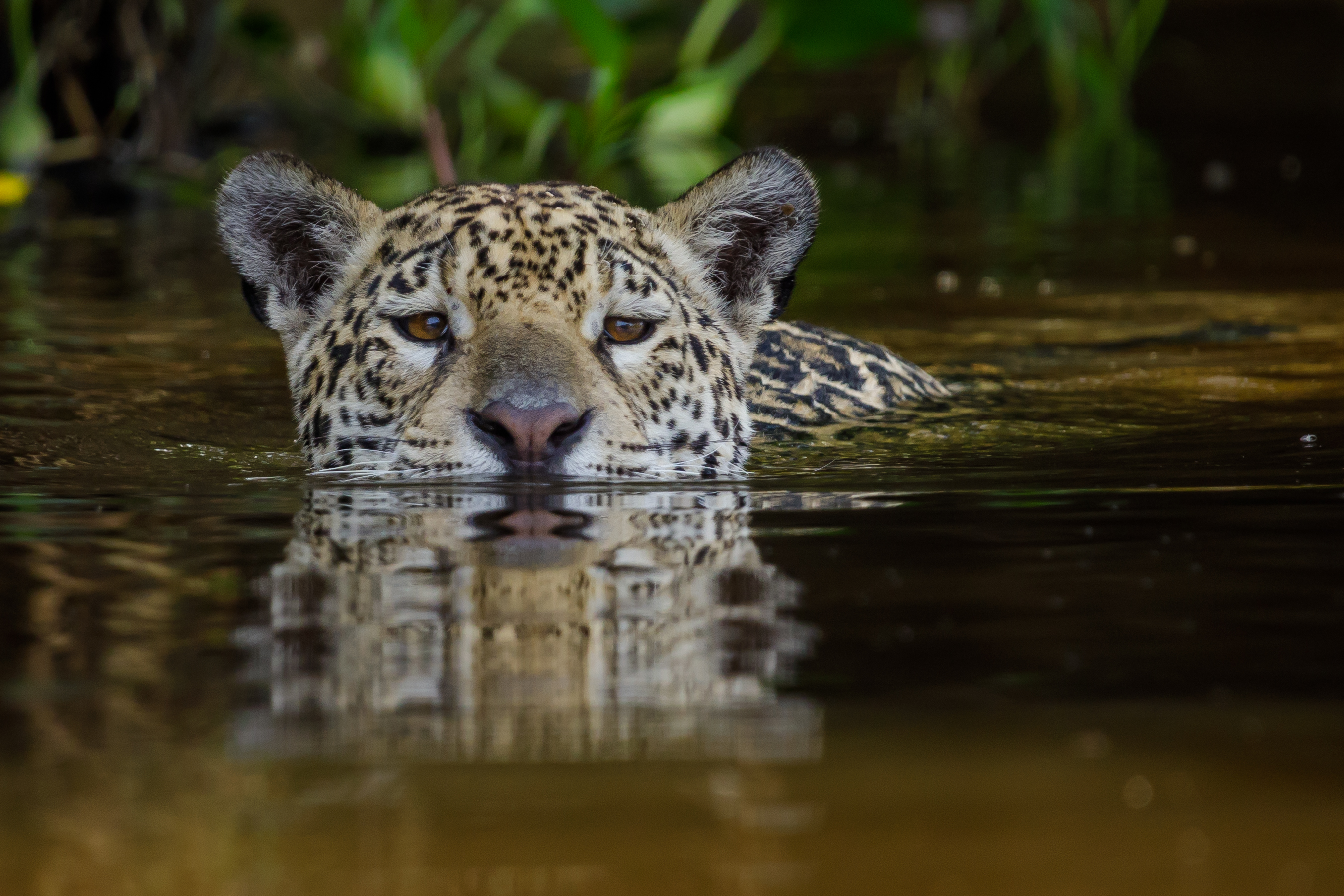
Jaguars were extinct in Corrientes Province for over 70 years before their reintroduction.

Rewilding Argentina started a project for reintroducing jaguars in 2010. Construction of the Jaguar Reintroduction Center on San Alonso Island in Iberá commenced in 2012. Jaguars had been extinct in Corrientes Province since the 1930s due to hunting and habitat loss. Individual jaguars were sourced from wildlife shelters and South American zoos, with the first arriving in 2015. In 2018 the first two jaguar cubs were born in Corrientes. The first jaguars were released into Iberá Park in 2021 with Iridium GPS collars. As of 2022, a population of 12 jaguars is thought to exist in the wetlands, feeding on feral hogs and capybaras.

Rewilding Argentina has also attempted to reintroduce guanacos to the Pampas region. A population of 45 translocated from Southern Patagonia was approved by the Ministry of Environment.

As of 2022, Rewilding Argentina also has plans for reintroduction projects for red-legged seriemas (Cariama cristata) and lowland pacas (Cuniculus paca).

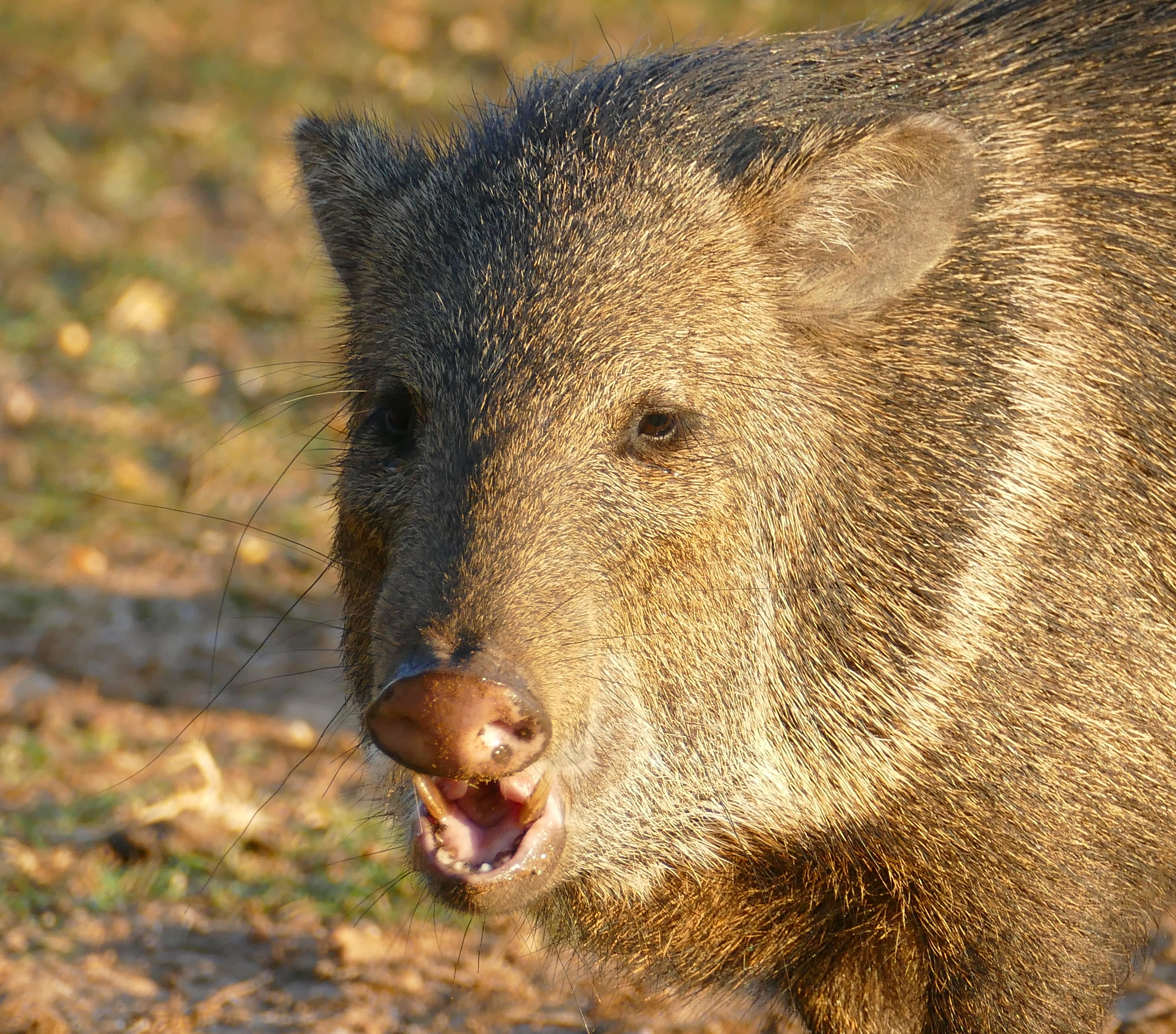
Collared peccaries are among the species that have been reintroduced by Rewilding Argentina.

In 2022, Rewilding Argentina signed an agreement with the government of Jujuy Province to restore native wildlife. The initial collaboration resulted in the transfer of five collared peccaries (Pecari tajacu) and an ocelot (Leopardus pardalis). To facilitate the reintroduction of ocelots to the Iberá Wetlands, a pre-release corral complex was created to help them adapt to the wild and develop hunting skills.

In April 2023, the Ministry of the Environment and Sustainable Development approved the import of three Chilean huemuls to the Patagonian Desert in Argentina. At a meeting of the National Parks Administration in June 2023, a proposed project by Rewilding Argentine to relocate swamp deer from Iberá to El Impenetrable National Park was determined to be unviable.

== Community relations ==
=== Capacity building and ecotourism ===
In conjunction with reintroductions of species, Rewilding Argentina works with rural communities in establishing a restoration economy with an emphasis on ecotourism and capacity building. The organization has focused on developing trails, campsites and infrastructure for nature tourism. Additionally, Rewilding Argentina has established "gateways" to nature preserves in adjacent communities. Local people have transitioned to jobs as tour guides and park rangers. The establishment of a Northern Ecotourism Corridor was backed by then-President Mauricio Macri and the Minister of Tourism.

=== Concerns about foreign investors and species introductions ===
The initial purchases of land by Doug Tompkins led to rumors that he worked for the CIA, or was buying up water resources or land for a secret military installation. In response to the speculation, Conservation Land Trust reframed their species introduction efforts as "nature production", resulting in a product that would attract tourism. The land trust blended its organizational goals with the Gaucho culture of Corrientes to connect rewilding efforts to local pride and heritage.

Opposition from people worried about a foreign organization owning land in Argentina was diffused when Rewilding Argentina donated the lands to the government. Nonetheless, the prospect of restoring jaguars to a cattle-ranching region was met with skepticism by locals. Ranchers have also opposed the reintroduction of guanacos and pumas.

In an ecocritical article in Green Letters, Soledad Altrudi called attention to the process of habituating pumas for ecotourism, writing that it is "predicated on controlling future animal behavior".

== See also ==
- Conservación Patagónica
- Passive rewilding
