= Lagostomus crassus =

Lagostomus crassus Temporal range: Late Holocene

Conservation status
- Extinct (IUCN 3.1)

Scientific classification
- Kingdom: Animalia
- Phylum: Chordata
- Class: Mammalia
- Order: Rodentia
- Family: Chinchillidae
- Genus: Lagostomus
- Species: †L. crassus

Binomial name
- †Lagostomus crassus Thomas, 1910

Extinct species of rodent

Lagostomus crassus is an extinct species of viscacha that was native to Peru. It is known from a single skull found in southern Peru.

The skull is not in any way fossilized, indicating that the animal it belonged to lived very recently. The skull is also identical to that of the extant plains viscacha, being comparable in size to that of a large individual. Based on the above factors, it is probable that Lagostomus crassus is not a valid taxon, and merely a plains viscacha that was transported to Peru in ancient times.
