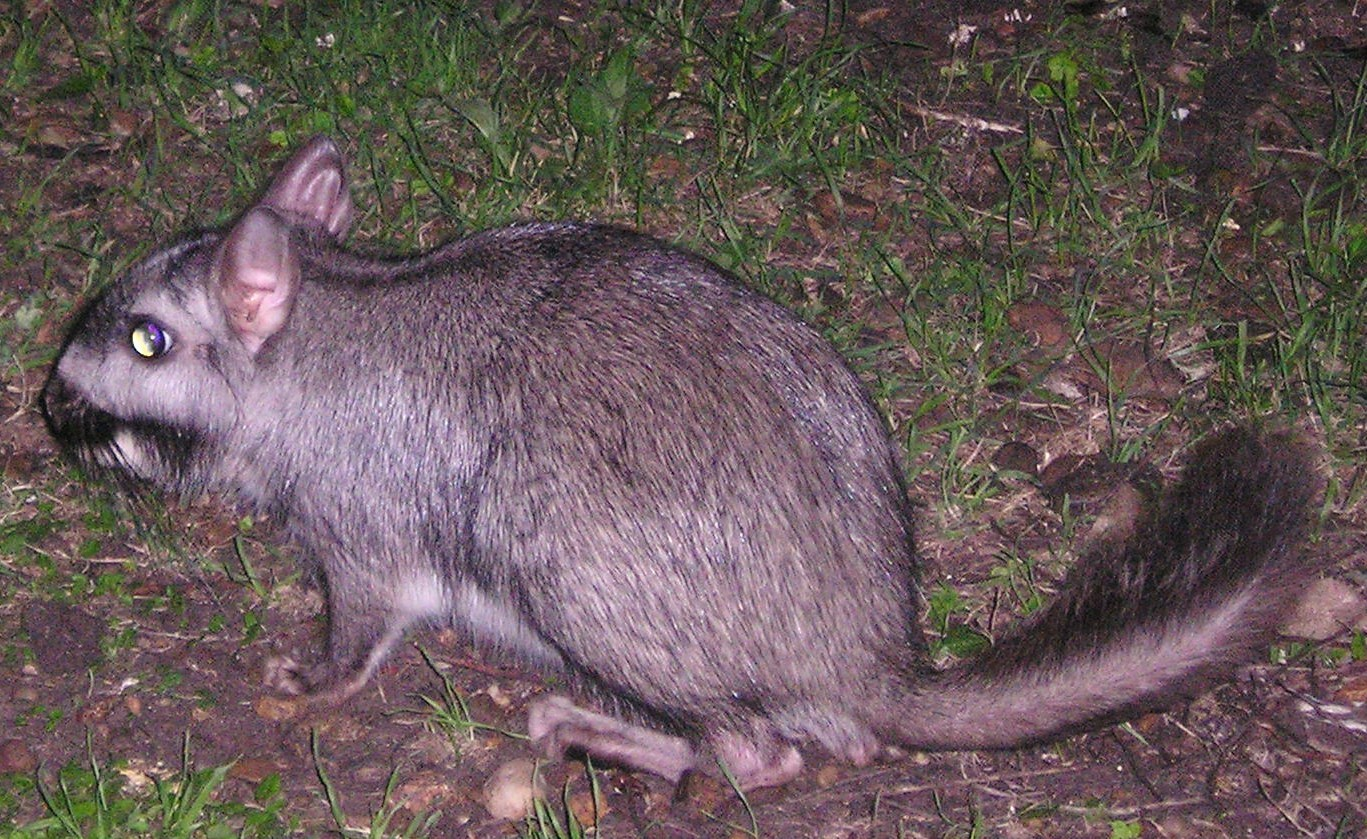
- Plains viscacha

Scientific classification
- Kingdom: Animalia
- Phylum: Chordata
- Class: Mammalia
- Infraclass: Placentalia
- Order: Rodentia
- Family: Chinchillidae
- Subfamily: Lagostominae; Bonaparte, 1838

Genera
- Lagostomus - plains viscachas; †Pliolagostomus; †Prolagostomus

= Lagostominae =

Lagostominae Temporal range: Late Oligocene–Recent

Subfamily of rodents

Lagostominae is a subfamily of the family Chinchillidae. It contains the genus Lagostomus and two extinct genera, Prolagostomus and Pliolagostomus.
