= Patagonia National Park =

Patagonia National Park may refer to:

- Patagonia National Park (Argentina), a national park the Argentinian portion of Patagonia
- Patagonia National Park (Chile), a national park in the Chilean portion of Patagonia
