= Sofía Heinonen =

Argentine conservationist and ecoutourism advocate

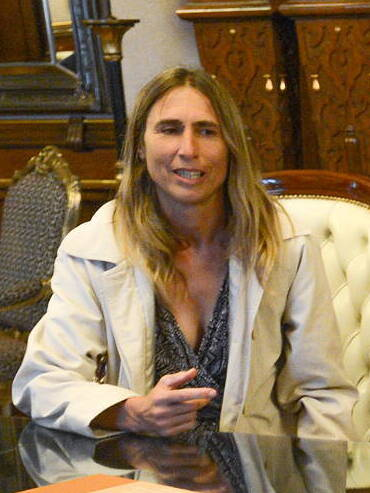
- Sofía Heinonen in 2015

Sofía Heinonen is an Argentine conservationist and ecoutourism advocate.

Heinonen is CEO of the nonprofit conservation organization Rewilding Argentina, which continues work started by Douglas and Kris Tompkins. The nonprofit converts private land into protected national parks and reintroduces native species to restore ecosystems and build sustainable ecotourism.

In December 2022 she was chosen as one of the BBC's 100 women.
