= Peruchinchilla =

Peruchinchilla Temporal range: Burdigalian

Scientific classification
- Kingdom: Animalia
- Phylum: Chordata
- Class: Mammalia
- Order: Rodentia
- Family: Chinchillidae
- Subfamily: Chinchillinae
- Genus: †Peruchinchilla; Arnal et al., 2026
- Species: †P. prima

Binomial name
- †Peruchinchilla prima Arnal et al., 2026

Extinct genus of chinchilline rodent

Peruchinchilla is an extinct monotypic genus of chinchilline rodent that lived in South America during the Burdigalian stage of the Early Miocene subepoch.

== Etymology ==
The generic name Peruchinchilla references the fossil organism's provenance from Peru and its taxonomic identity as a chinchilline. The generic name and specific epithet of the type species, Peruchinchilla prima, taken together mean "the most ancient chinchilla from Peru".
