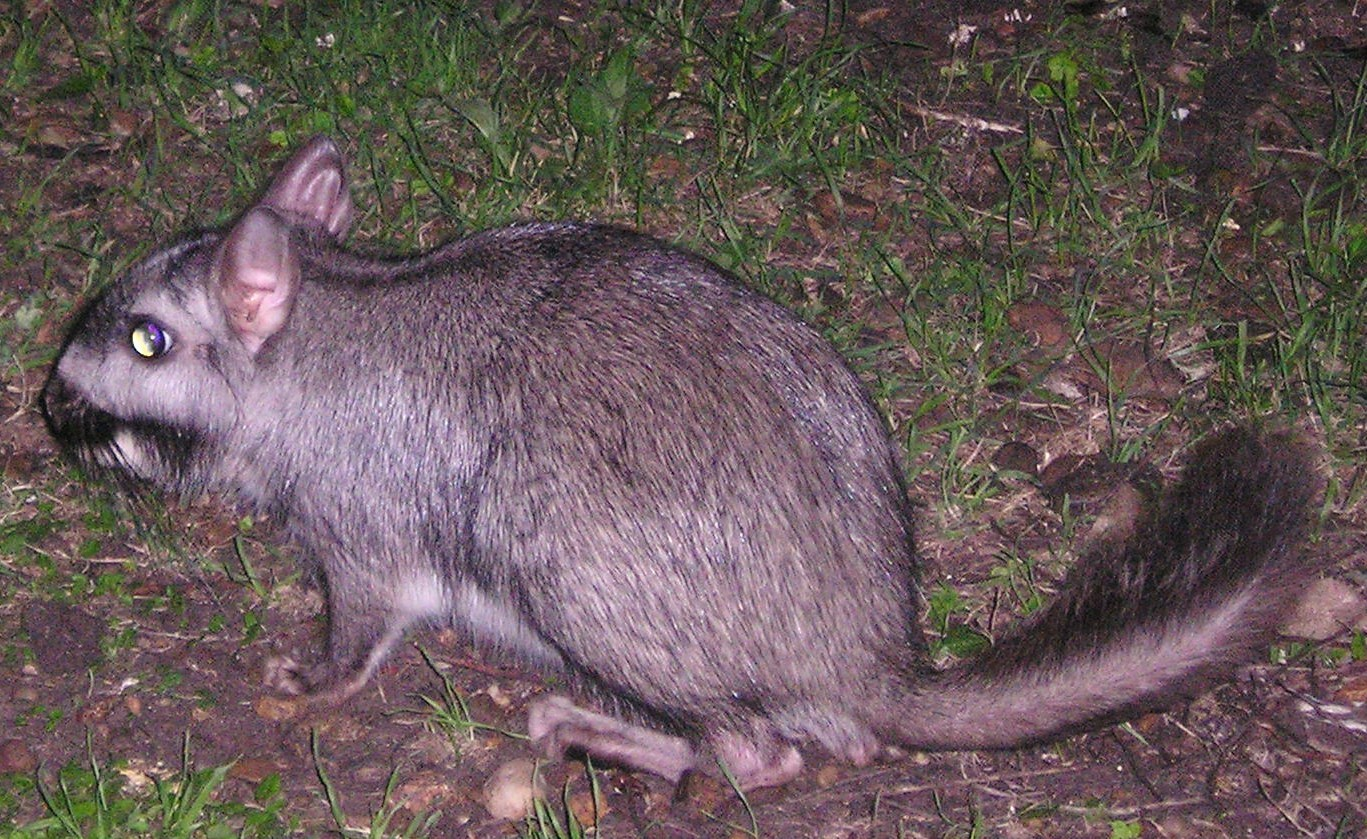
- Plains viscacha

Scientific classification
- Kingdom: Animalia
- Phylum: Chordata
- Class: Mammalia
- Order: Rodentia
- Family: Chinchillidae
- Subfamily: Lagostominae
- Genus: Lagostomus; Brookes, 1828

Type species
- Lagostomus trichodactylus Brookes, 1828 (= Dipus maximus Desmarest, 1817)

Species
- †Lagostomus crassus?; Lagostomus maximus; †Lagostomus telenkechanum; †Lagostomus pretrichodactyla

Synonyms
- Viscacia (Rengger, 1830)

= Lagostomus =

Genus of mammals belonging to the chinchilla family of rodents

Lagostomus is a South American genus of rodents in the family Chinchillidae. It contains a single living species, the plains viscacha, and it is the only Holocene genus in the subfamily Lagostominae. It probably only has one extant species; the taxa Lagostomus crassus is probably not valid.
