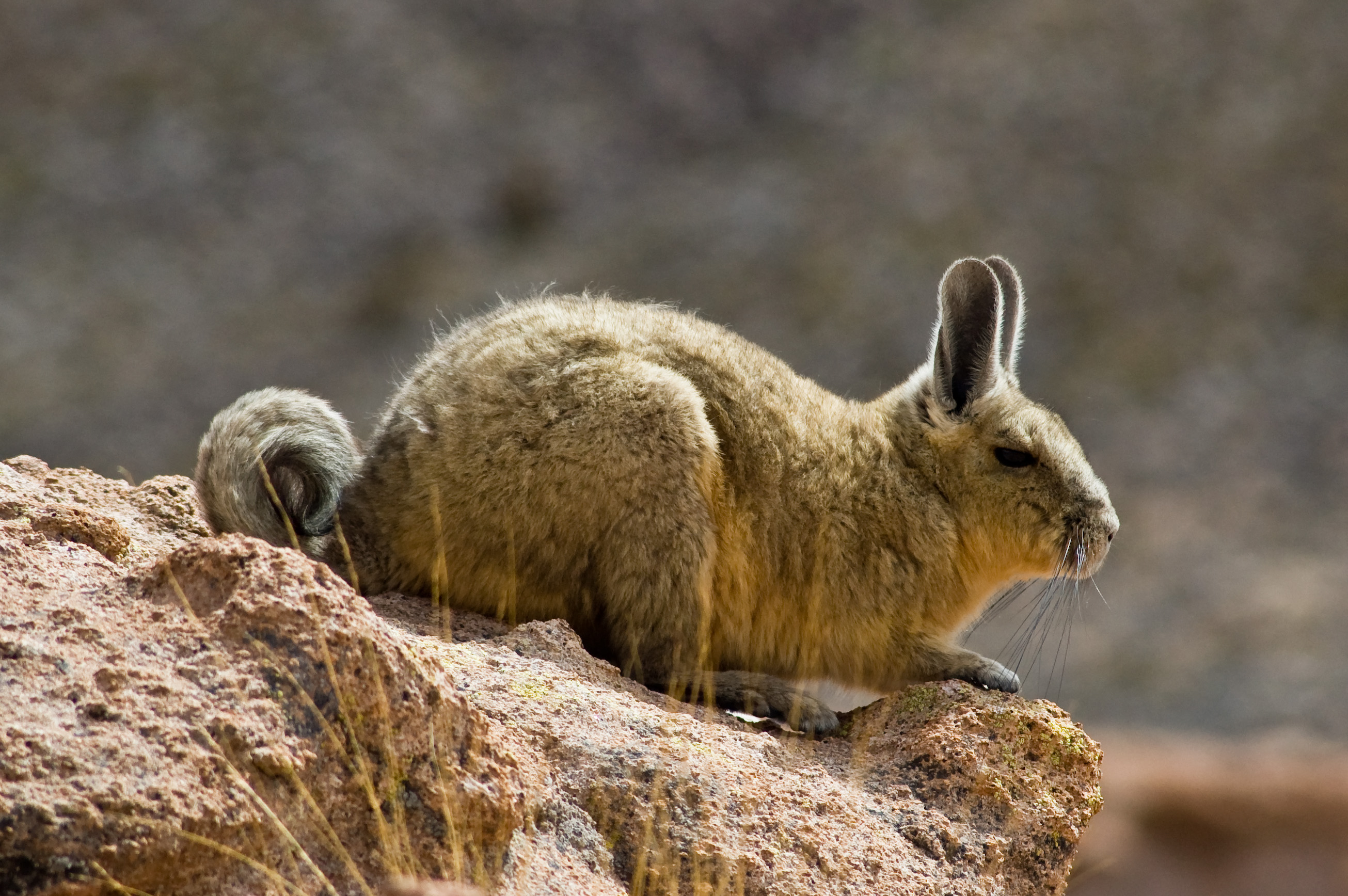

Conservation status
- Least Concern (IUCN 3.1)

Scientific classification
- Kingdom: Animalia
- Phylum: Chordata
- Class: Mammalia
- Order: Rodentia
- Family: Chinchillidae
- Genus: Lagidium
- Species: L. viscacia

Binomial name
- Lagidium viscacia (Molina, 1782)
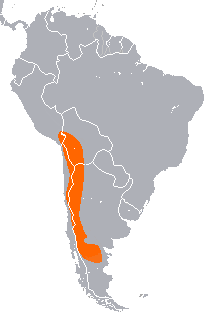

= Southern viscacha =

Species of rodent

The southern viscacha (Lagidium viscacia) is a species of viscacha, a rodent in the family Chinchillidae found in Argentina, Bolivia, Chile, and Peru. It is a colonial animal living in small groups in rocky mountain areas. It has long ears and hind legs and resembles a rabbit in appearance apart from its long, bushy tail; however, it is not a lagomorph.

== Description ==
The southern viscacha has yellowish-grey upperparts, paler underparts, and a black-tipped, bushy tail. The body fur is long and soft, while that on the tail is coarse. The long, fur-covered ears have a white fringe and both the short front legs and longer hind legs have four digits on the feet. The soles of the feet have fleshy pads called "pallipes", and they can move about with agility over rocky surfaces. The weight of an adult southern viscacha is about 3 kg (6.6 lb). They are also adept climbers, exhibiting proficiency in ascending vertical rock surfaces. Their leaps frequently span distances of five meters or greater, with downward descents covering distances of over fifteen meters. These jumps are often executed from small ledges on which they can barely stand to comparatively narrow outcroppings of rock.

== Distribution/Habitat ==
The southern viscacha is native to the mountainous parts of western Argentina, southern Peru, western and central Bolivia, and northern and central Chile. It lives among rocks and around crags where the vegetation is sparse. Its elevation range is about 700 to 5,100 m (2,300 to 16,700 ft) above sea level.

== Behaviour ==
The southern viscacha does not hibernate and is mostly active soon after dawn and again in the evening. At these times, it emerges from its underground hiding place to feed on what plant material is available, which is mostly grasses and moss, and it also eats lichens. Part of the day is spent perched on a rock sunbathing, grooming, or resting. Southern viscachas are a colonial species and do not venture far from rocks so that they can plunge underground if danger threatens. They use various calls to communicate with each other. They are preyed on by the Andean mountain cat (Leopardus jacobitus) and they form a substantial part of its diet.

Breeding starts in the last quarter of the year when mating takes place. The gestation period is about 130 days and a single precocial pup (or sometimes two) is born which has its eyes open and is fully clad in fur at birth. It suckles for about eight weeks, but is able to supplement the milk with solid food within hours of its birth. The average lifespan is unknown, but one individual survived for 19 years in captivity.

== Status ==
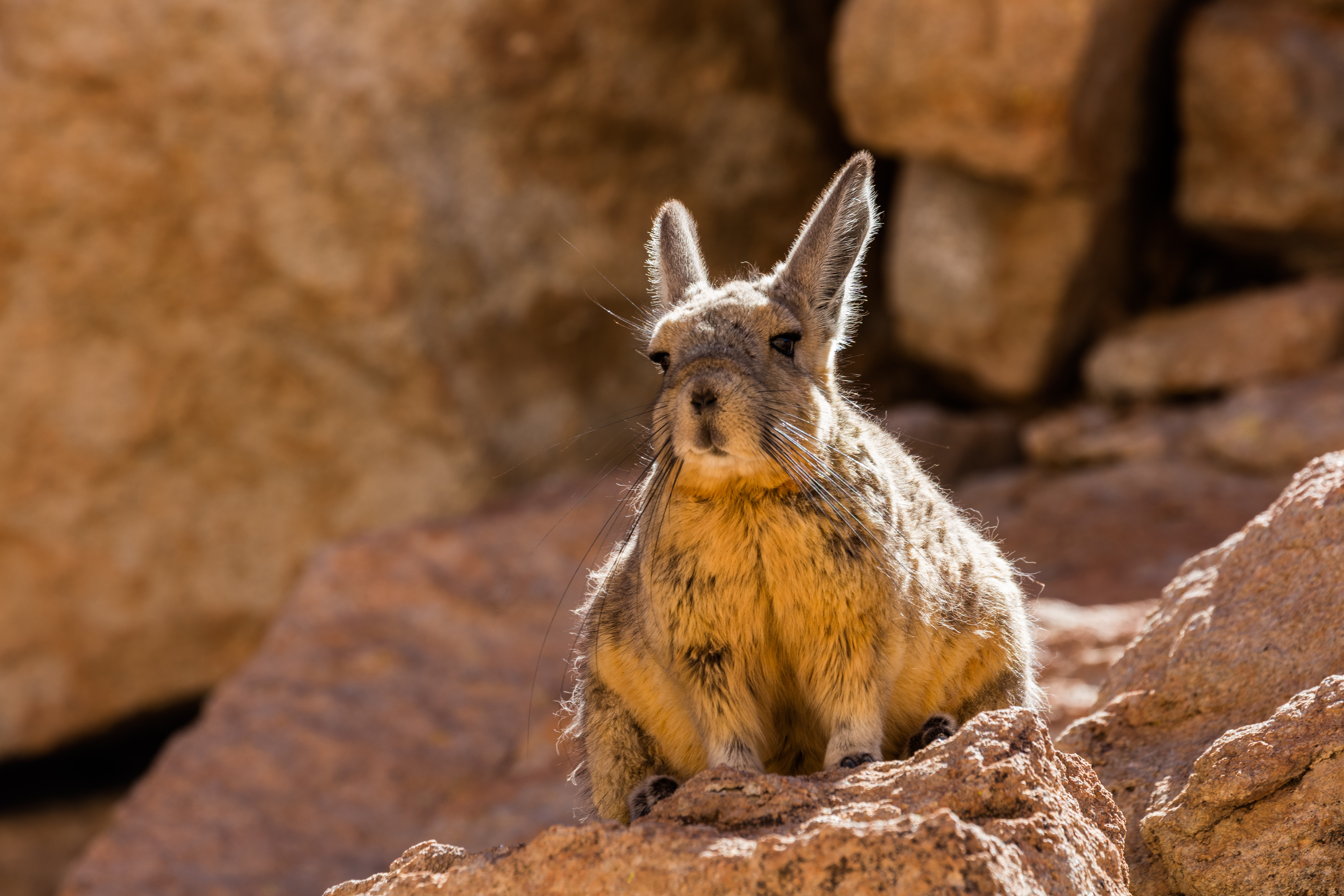
Southern viscacha (Lagidium viscacia), Siloli desert, Bolivia

The southern viscacha is a common species and locally abundant, but it is prone to wide swings in population due to adverse weather conditions. It is hunted for its flesh and its fur, but not to such an extent as to reduce its numbers significantly. The IUCN lists it as being of Least Concern.
