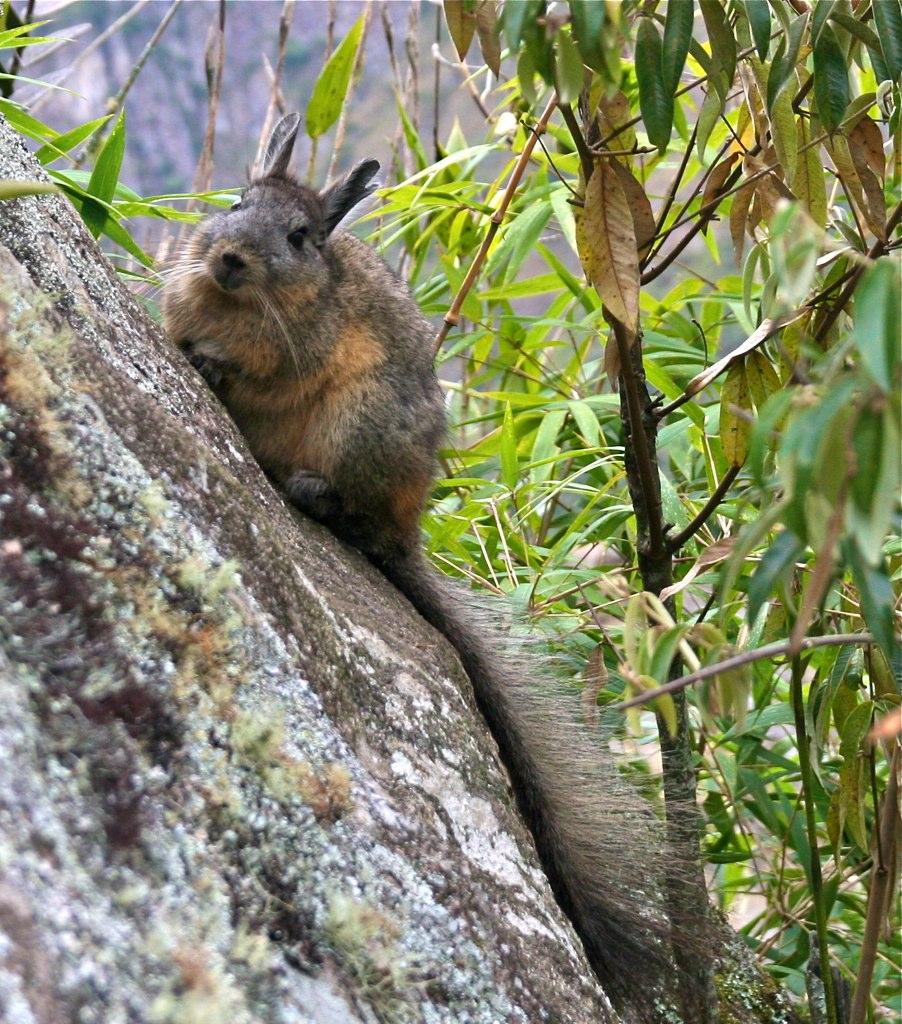

Conservation status
- Least Concern (IUCN 3.1)

Scientific classification
- Kingdom: Animalia
- Phylum: Chordata
- Class: Mammalia
- Infraclass: Placentalia
- Order: Rodentia
- Family: Chinchillidae
- Genus: Lagidium
- Species: L. peruanum

Binomial name
- Lagidium peruanum Meyen, 1833
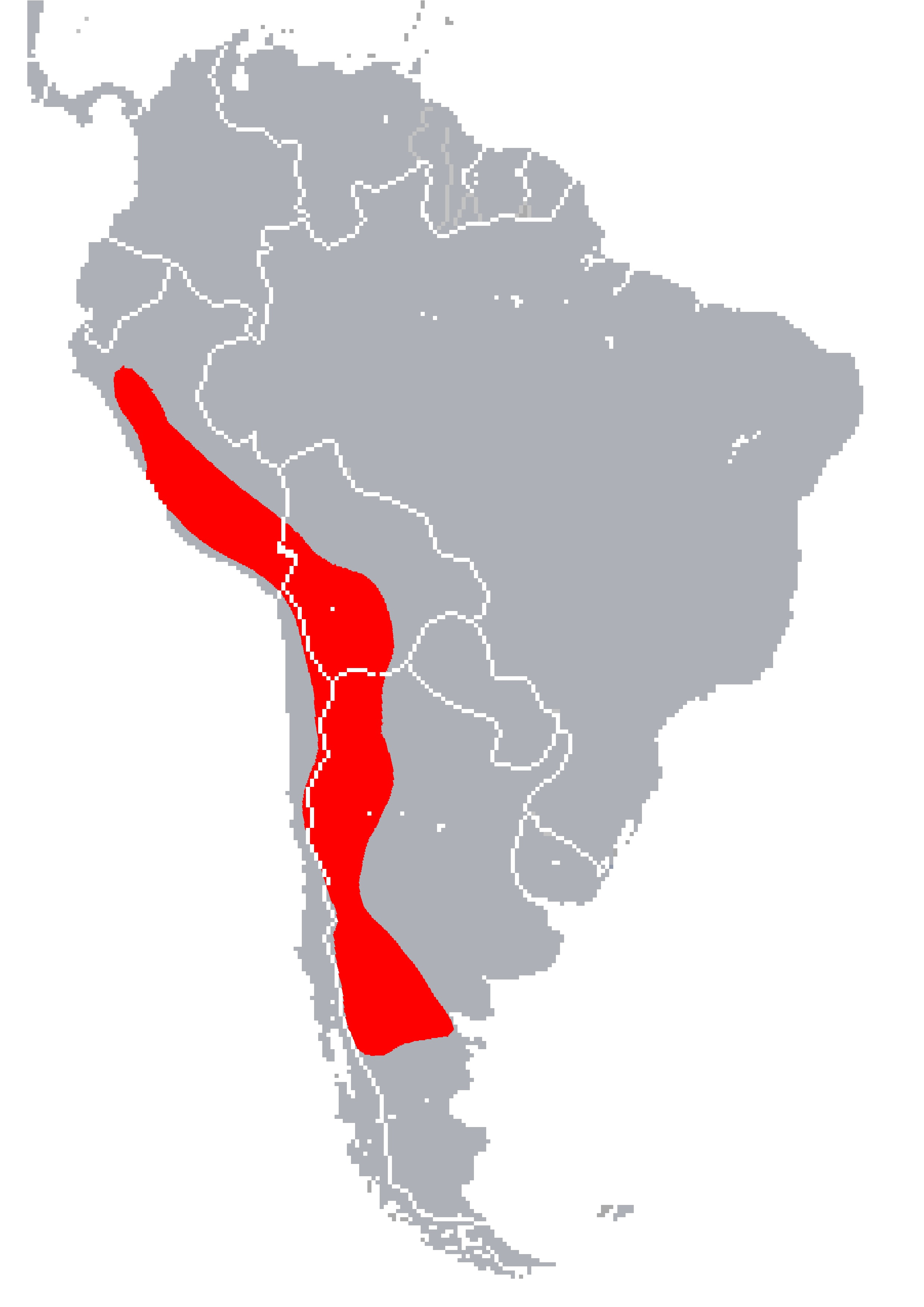

= Northern viscacha =

Species of rodent

The northern viscacha (Lagidium peruanum) is a species of viscacha, a rodent in the family Chinchillidae. It is known from Peru and Chile, at elevations from 300 to 5000 m, and may also be present in Bolivia.

== Description ==
The northern viscacha grows to a head and body length of some 300 to 450 mm (12 to 18 in) with a bushy tail nearly as long which can be curled in a coil. The adult weight is between 900 and 1,600 g (32 and 56 oz). Its long ears are furry and its body fur is dense and soft, but the tail has coarser hairs. The dorsal (upper) surface ranges from dark grey at lower altitudes to brown at higher elevations. The ventral (under) surface is cream or pale grey and the tip of the tail is reddish-brown or black. The northern viscacha has been observed leaping over six feet and can swim when necessary.

== Distribution and habitat ==
The northern viscacha is native to central and southern Peru and northern Chile, and may also be present in the area around Lake Titicaca in Peru and Bolivia. Its altitude range extends from 300 to 5,000 m (980 to 16,400 ft) above sea level. It makes its home in crevices in the rock and is found in various habitats where suitable rocky outcrops are found. Most populations occur between the tree line and the snow line, but the distribution is patchy with the animal being common in some localities and absent in others even though the habitat seems equally suitable.

== Behaviour ==
The northern viscacha is a herbivore and feeds on a variety of plant material, including grasses, roots, and seeds. Breeding usually takes place during October and November. A litter usually consists of a single pup born after a gestation period around 140 days. The young is weaned when about 8 weeks old.

It is preyed on by the Andean mountain cat (Leopardus jacobitus), the colocolo (Leopardus colocolo), and the culpeo (Lycalopex culpaeus) in high-altitude desert regions. The northern viscacha is more often found on larger, steeper portions of cliffs. This preference is probably driven by a need to avoid predators, as land-based carnivores are more easily evaded on a steep slope. It rarely ventures far from rocks, as these provide a means of escaping from both aerial and terrestrial predators. The northern viscacha rarely has more than 50 yards of open ground between its colony and water.

Northern viscachas are gregarious and communicate using warning whistles. Vicuna will search for threats upon hearing the northern viscacha's whistle. The bolivian big-eared mouse will sun and feed alongside northern viscachas on occasion.

== Status ==
The northern viscacha is common within suitable habitat in its range. The population size is relatively stable. Although it is hunted locally for food, no other significant threats have been identified; as such, the IUCN lists the species as being of Least Concern in its Red List of Threatened Species.

== Gallery ==
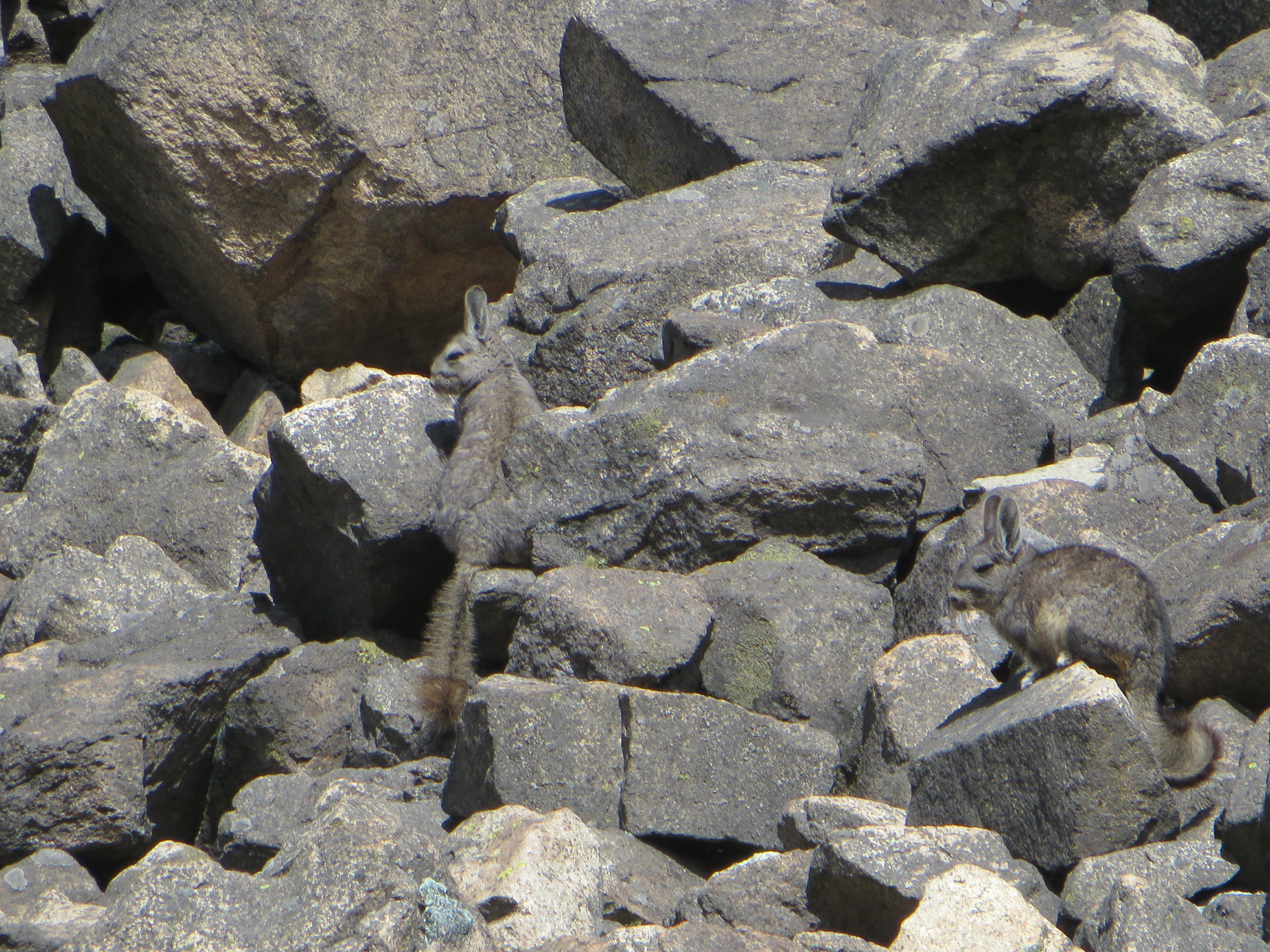
Vizcachas, Chicla city, Huarochiri, Lima, Peru

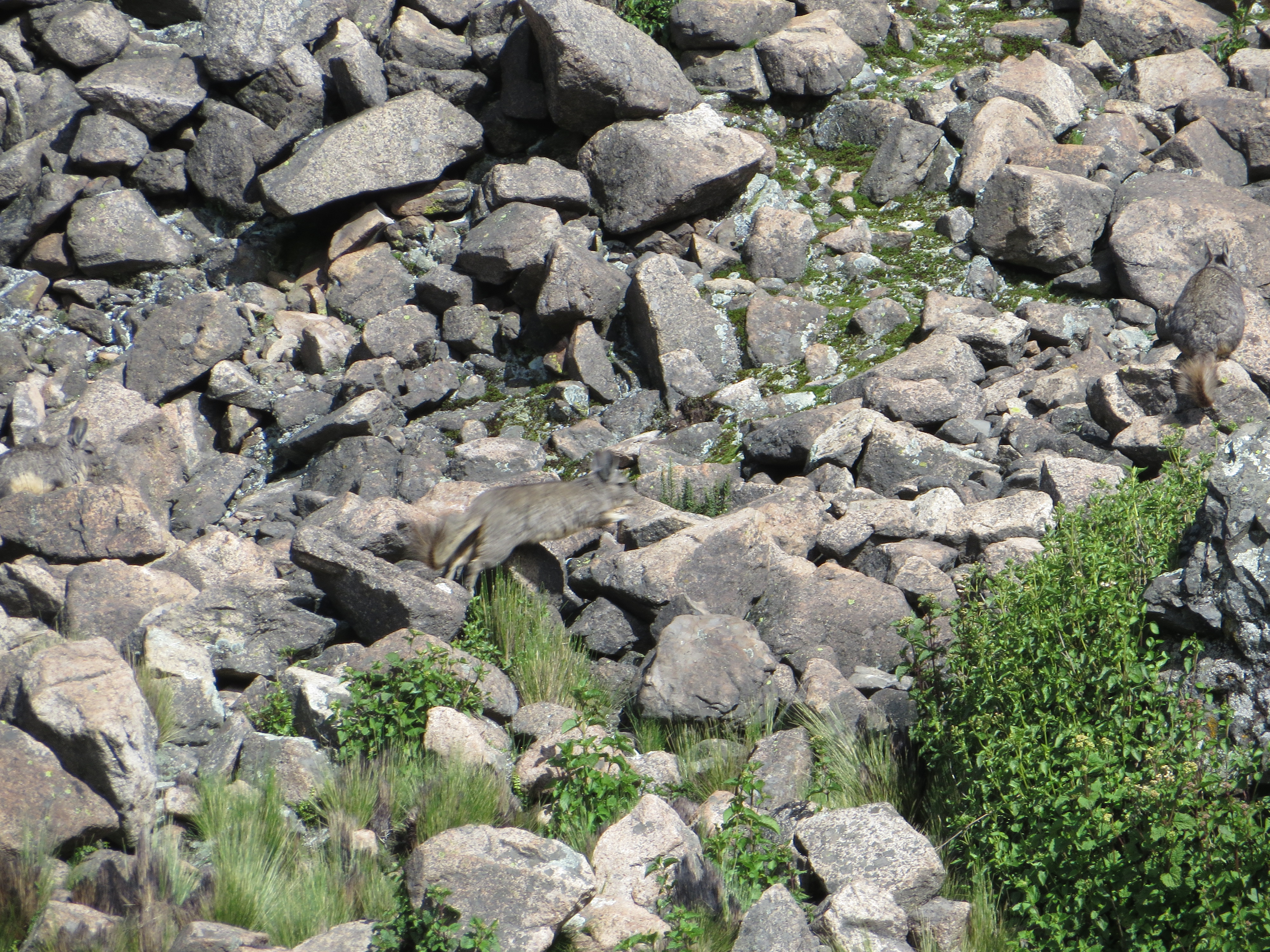
Vizcachas, photos taken near Chicla city, road to Neveria Lagoon, Lima, Peru

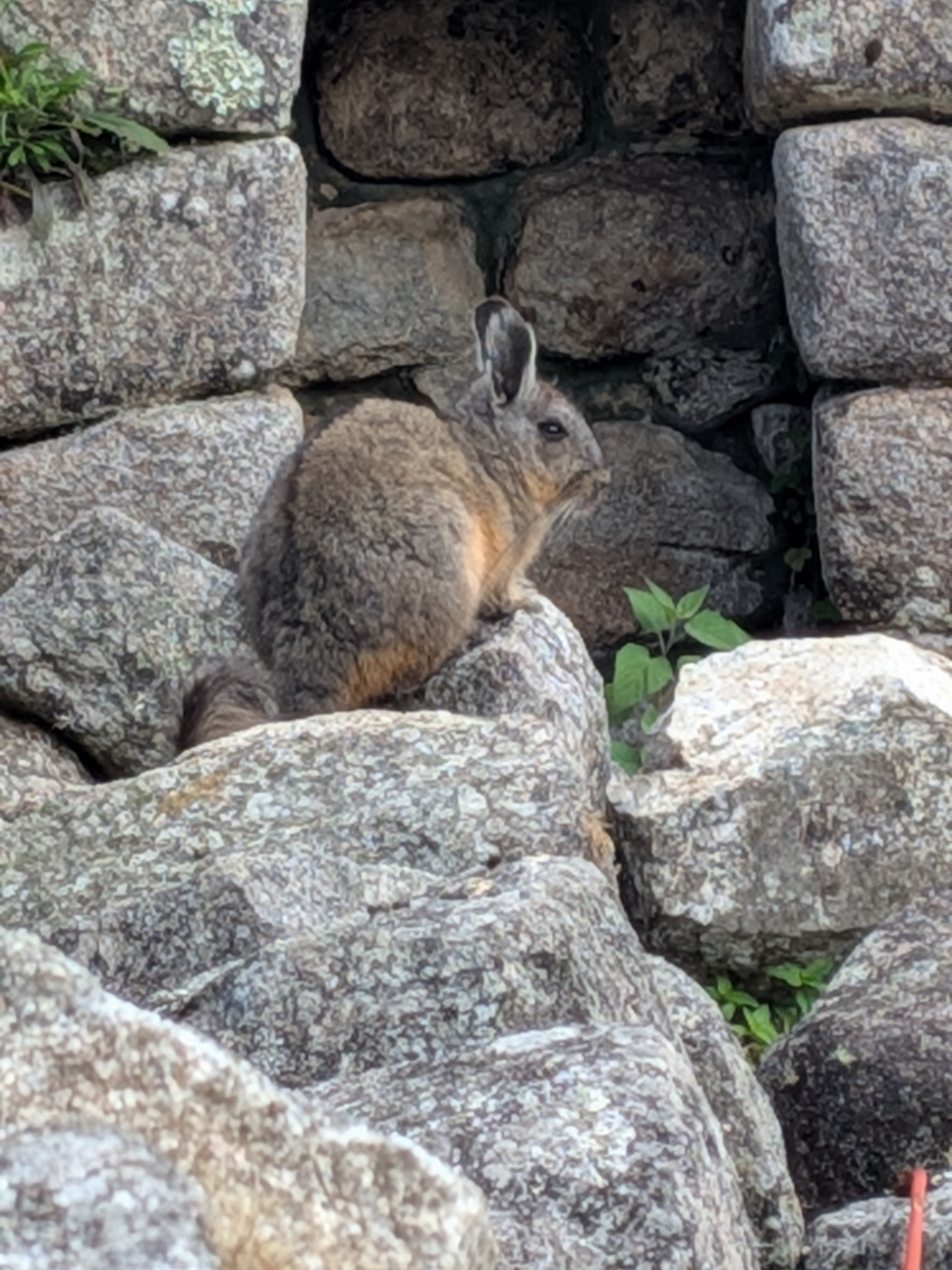
