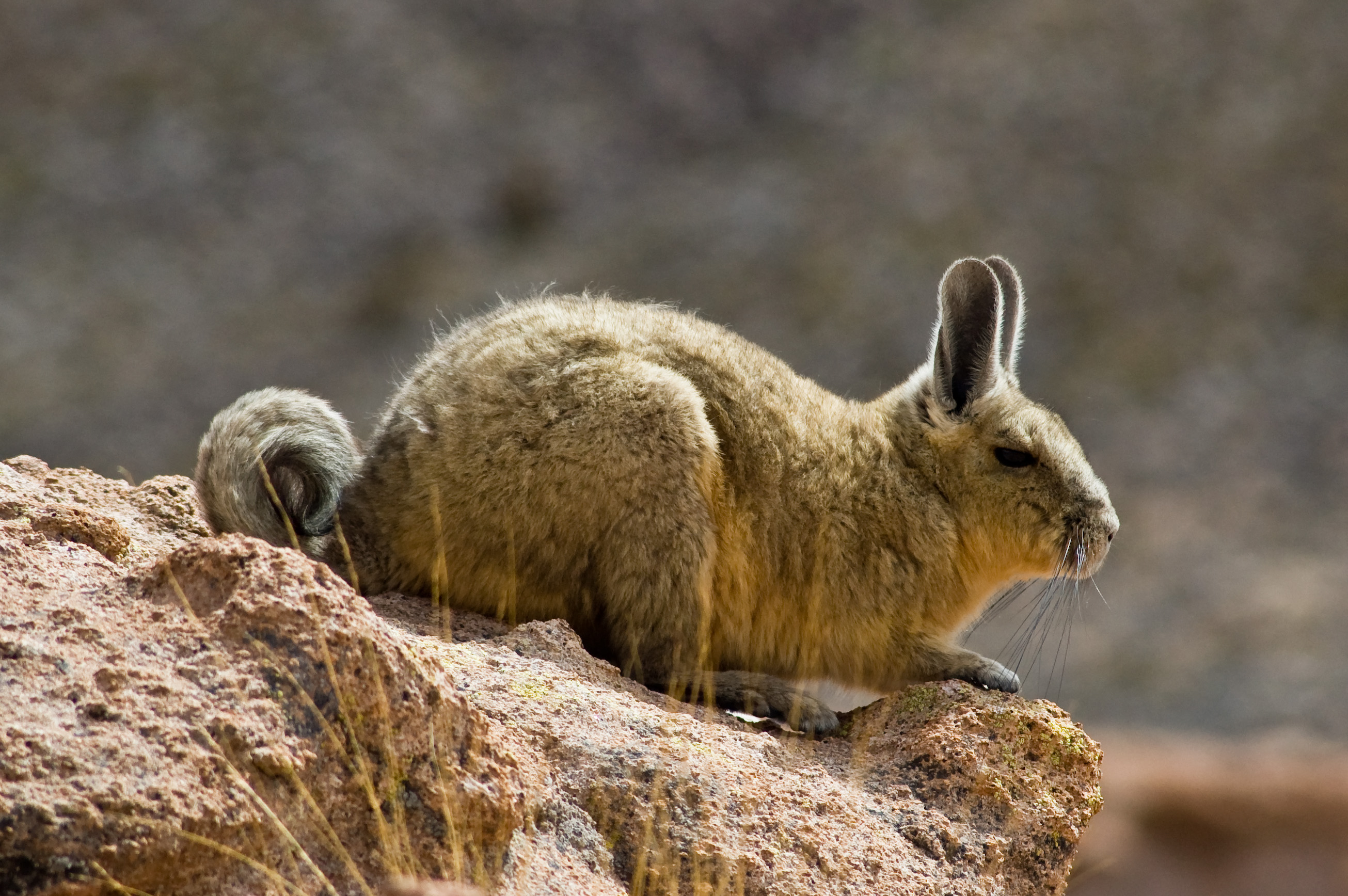
- Southern viscacha

Scientific classification
- Kingdom: Animalia
- Phylum: Chordata
- Class: Mammalia
- Order: Rodentia
- Family: Chinchillidae
- Subfamily: Chinchillinae
- Genus: Lagidium; Meyen, 1833

Type species
- Lagidium peruanum Meyen, 1833

Species
- See text.
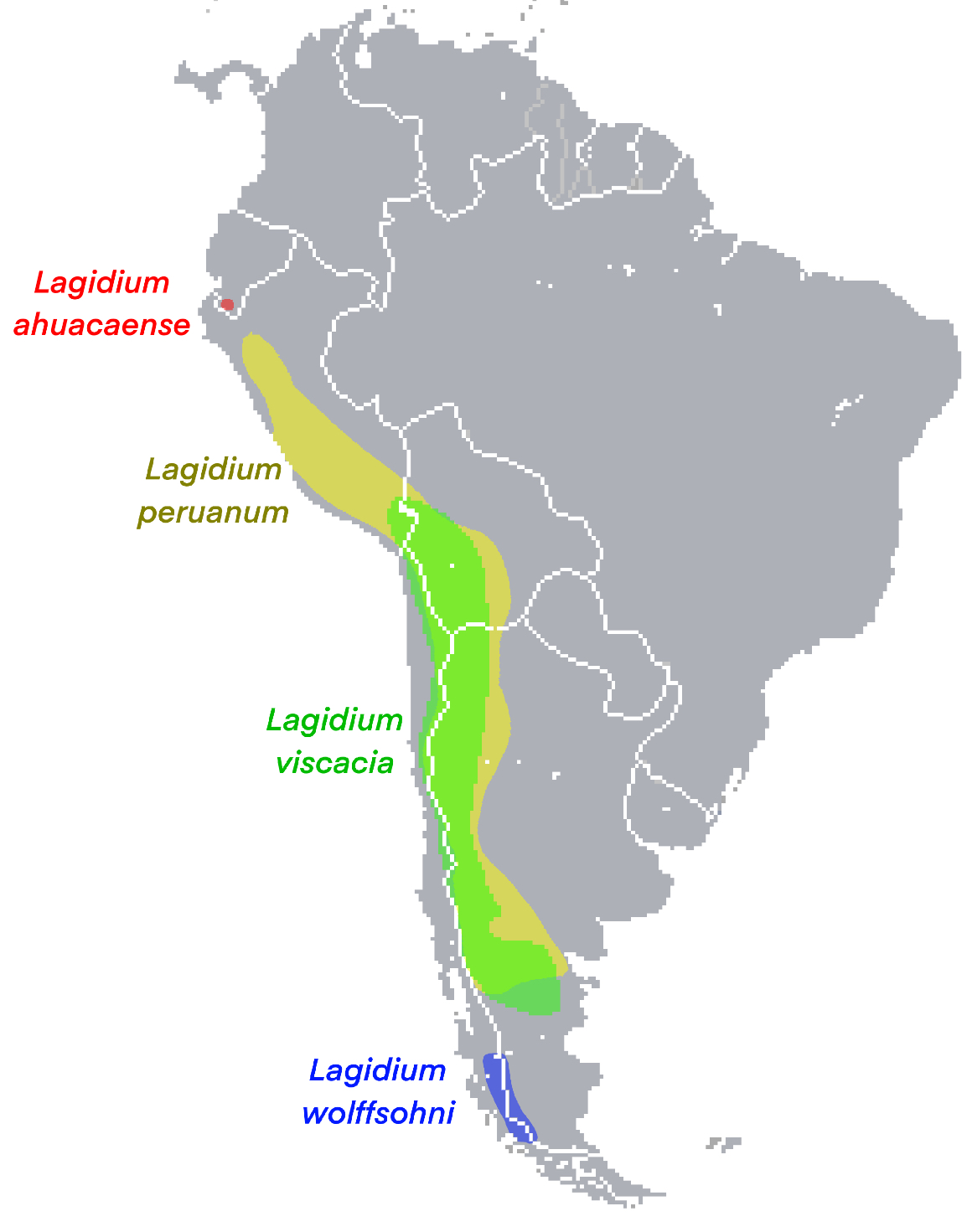

= Lagidium =

Genus of rodents

Lagidium is a genus of rodents in the family Chinchillidae.

== Taxonomy ==
Prior to 2009, most authors considered there to be three species of mountain viscachas. However, taxonomy sometimes differs by authors (e.g. L. peruanum is included within L. viscacia according to Anderson 1997). Four species are currently recognised:

- Ecuadorean mountain viscacha (L. ahuacaense)
- Northern viscacha (L. peruanum)
- Southern viscacha (L. viscacia)
- Wolffsohn's viscacha (L. wolffsohni)

== Distribution and habitat ==
=== Range ===
The northern viscacha occurs in central and southern Peru and northern Chile. The distribution is shown to be the Andes mountains in Peru at elevations between 3,000 and 5,000 m. The southern viscacha occurs in southern Peru, southern and western Bolivia, northern Chile, and western Argentina. They occur between 2,500 and 5,100 m above sea level.

Little is known about L. wolffsohni.

=== Habitat and ecology ===
L. peruanum prefers dry, rocky, habitats between the timber line and snow line of the Andes mountains, with sparse vegetation and coarse grasses. It is an herbivorous species and is found near water that offers better vegetation than the drier regions within its habitat. L. viscacia inhabits rocky mountain areas, as well as rock outcrops in steppe habitat. It is restricted to sparsely vegetated areas from 2,500 to 5,100 m above sea level. This herbivorous species is specialized and restricted to rocky habitats where it colonizes rock crevices and also associates with available habitat that is patchy.

In large, steeper portions of the cliffs are more heavily used than less steep portions. Habitat use both on and away from the cliffs appears to be driven by predator avoidance, as they can probably more easily escape terrestrial predators on a steep slope. They rarely venture away from rocks which provide a means for escape from both aerial and terrestrial predators.

== Characteristics ==
Members of this species are medium- to large-sized rodents that also look remarkably like a long-tailed rabbit. Soft, dense fur covers its body, from the tips of its elongated fur-covered ears, edged with a fringe of white fur to the end of its long, curled tail. Its tail is bushy and can range up to about one-third of the length of its body. The fore limbs are relatively short, while the contrastingly long and muscular hind limbs enable it to run and jump with ease. However, the number of digits on the hind feet is reduced to four (apparent in chinchillas, as well). The color of its fur varies seasonally and with age, but generally the upper parts are grey to brown, with tints of cream and black, while the underparts are pale yellow or tan. However, contrary to the former statement, it has been stated elsewhere that they have pale yellow or grey upper parts, and a black tail tip. They weigh up to 6.6 lbs (3 kg) and have fairly delicate incisors in which the enamel of the incisors is not colored.

== Behavior ==
L. peruanum, a diurnal species, is active throughout the year. It leaps among rocks and performs a series of whistles and trills associated with warning. Colonial structures are composed of small family units of two to five individuals in a subdivided colony that can be as large as 75 animals.

L. viscacia is also diurnal and is most active near sunrise and sunset. It spends the day on perches, grooming and sunning. It is adept at moving over rocky surfaces and does not hibernate.

== Biology ==
In L. peruanum, males tend to be promiscuous. The gestation period for the female is 140 days, and the usual litter size is one. It is viviparous and lactation lasts about eight weeks. In Peru, mating takes place from October through November. Both female and male sexual maturities are reached after one year and weaning has been found to occur after 59 days.

In L. viscacia, mating occurs from October through December. After a gestation of 120–140 days, a female gives birth to a single, precocious young. The young are born fully furred, with their eyes open, and are able to eat solid food on their first day of life.

Their diet is principally composed of grasses, mosses, and lichens.

== Conservation ==
Besides being the chief food source of the Andean mountain cat, the southern viscacha is often hunted for its meat and fur, but it is still a very common species. Its population is not thought to be declining at a rate to warrant significant concern. The genus of Lagidium, as a whole, is listed to be of "least concern" on the red list category because it occurs in multiple protected areas and is restricted to rock formations.
