= El Impenetrable National Park =

National park in Argentina

- Parque Nacional El Impenetrable
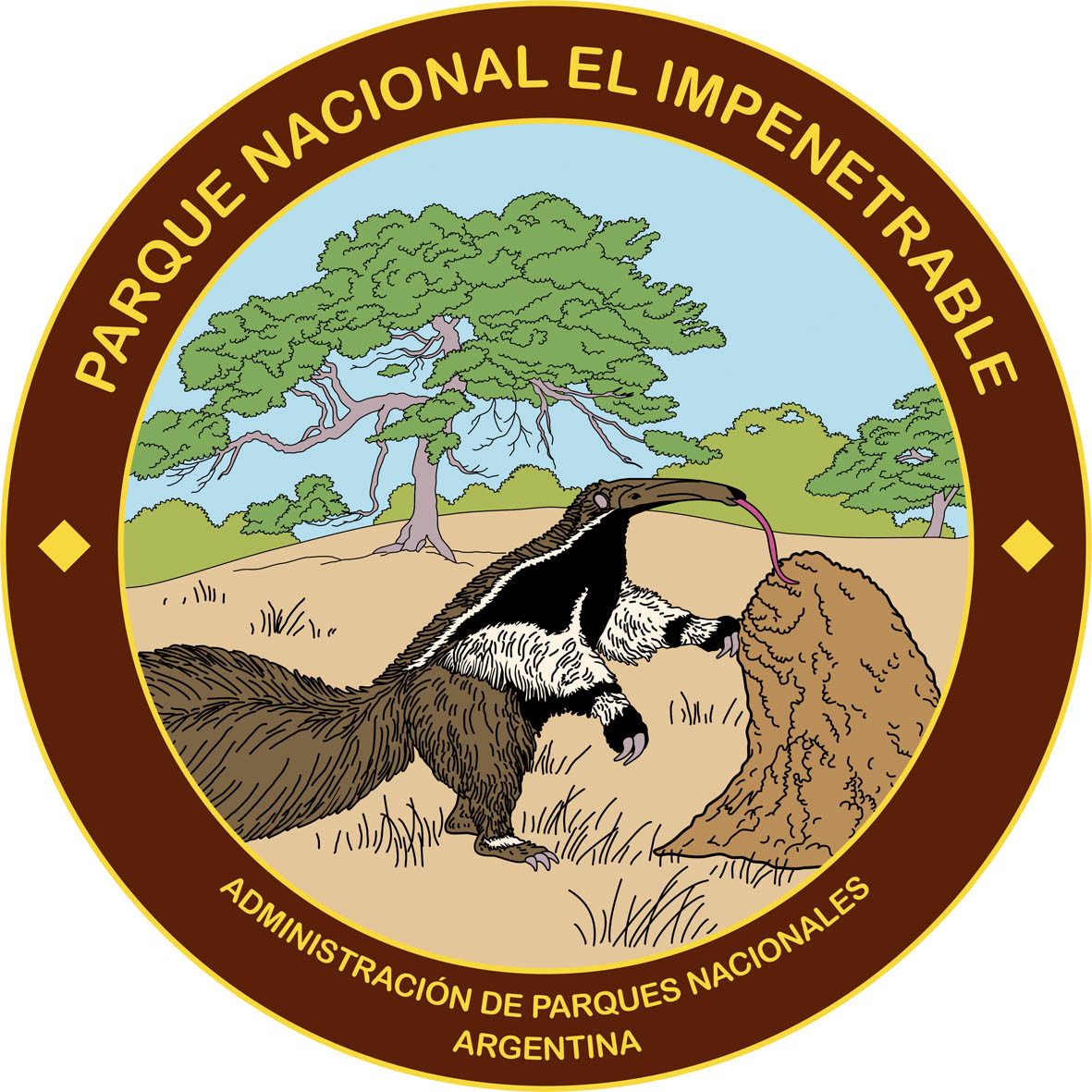
- Emblem of the El Impenetrable National Park

- Location within Argentina
- Location: Chaco Province and Formosa Province, Argentina
- Coordinates: 25°00′34.2″S 60°59′45.24″W
- Area: 1,289 km^{2} (498 sq mi)
- Established: 2017
- Governing body: Administración de Parques Nacionales

El Impenetrable National Park (Spanish: Parque Nacional El Impenetrable) is a national park in the Gran Chaco region of northern Argentina. It was established in 2014 on the lands of the former Estancia La Fidelidad, which were expropriated after the owner, Manuel Roseo, was murdered in 2011 in an attempt to gain control of the estate. The park opened to visitors in 2017. It is the largest natural park in northern Argentina, with a total area of approximately 128,000 hectares (roughly 316,000 acres).
