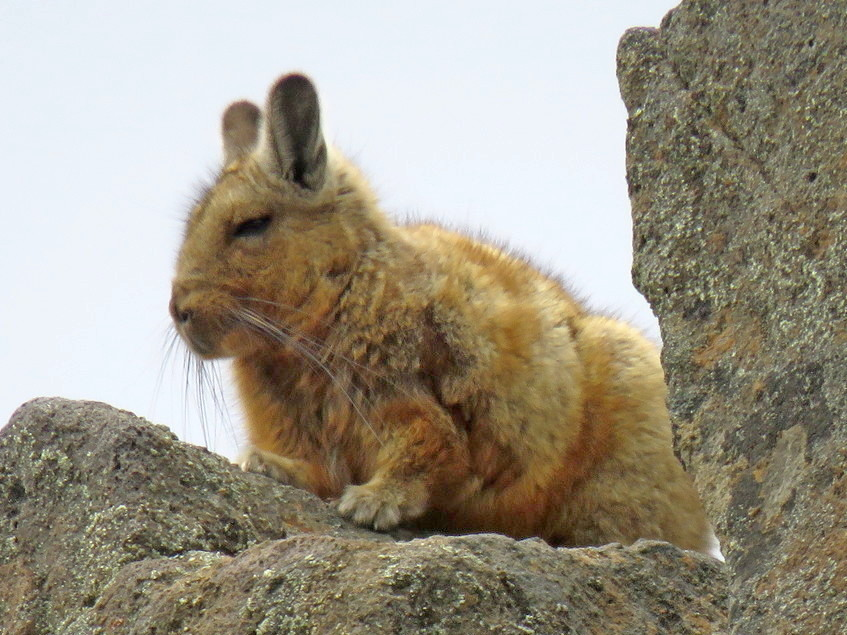

Conservation status
- Data Deficient (IUCN 3.1)

Scientific classification
- Kingdom: Animalia
- Phylum: Chordata
- Class: Mammalia
- Order: Rodentia
- Family: Chinchillidae
- Genus: Lagidium
- Species: L. wolffsohni

Binomial name
- Lagidium wolffsohni (Thomas, 1907)
- Lagidium wolffsohni range

= Wolffsohn's viscacha =

Species of rodent

Wolffsohn's viscacha (Lagidium wolffsohni), and locally known as chinchillón anaranjado, is a rare species of rodent in the family Chinchillidae. This species occurs in southwestern Argentina and adjacent Chile. It occurs up to about 4,000 m (13,000 ft) above sea level. It is found in rocky outcrops in mountainous areas.

== Etymology ==
Wolffsohn's viscacha was initially intended to be named after the president of Wolffsohn's company. However, Oldfield Thomas, on behalf of the British Museum, named it Wolffsohni in recognition of Wolffsohn's contributions to the study of the species.

== Description ==
Wolffsohn's viscacha features a relatively large body, measuring approximately 470 mm (19 in) from head to rear, with the tail extending up to 305 mm (12 in). The coat is characterized by a wool-like texture, with hair lengths varying between 35 and 50 mm. Notably, the tail hairs can exceed a length of 150 mm (6 in). It is easily identifiable by its orange-clay coloration, short black ears, and distinctly bushy tail.

== Diet ==
Wolffsohn's viscacha is a specialist herbivore that primarily consumes grasses when available. Grasses, including Festuca pallescens, as well as genera Pappostipa and Poa, comprise 60.4% of its diet. The fruit of Berberis heterophylla comprises 21% of its diet.
