= Patagonia National Park (Argentina) =

- IUCN category II (national park)
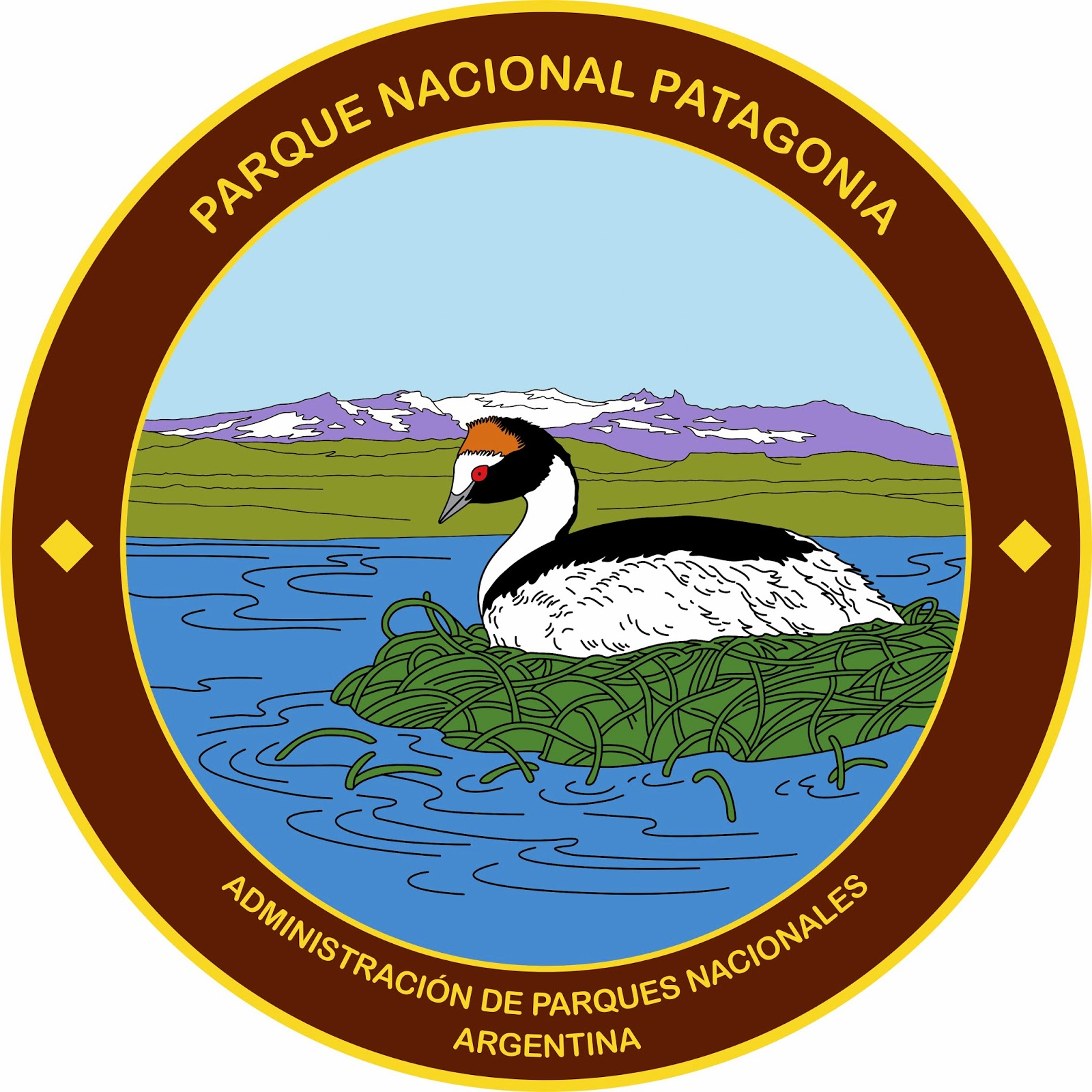

- Location within Argentina
- Location: Santa Cruz Province, Argentina
- Coordinates: 47.16°S 71.32°W
- Area: 528.11 km^{2} (203.90 sq mi)
- Designation: National park
- Designated: 2015
- Governing body: National Parks Administration

Patagonia National Park is a national park in southern Argentina. It was designated in 2015, and covers an area of 528.11 km^{2}. It protects a portion of the Patagonian steppe.

Patagonia Wilderness Nature Reserve (387.87 km^{2}), designated in 2018, adjoins the national park to the north and east.
