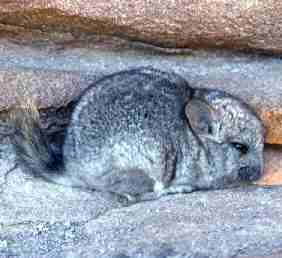
- Chinchilla chinchilla (formerly Chinchilla brevicaudata)

Scientific classification
- Kingdom: Animalia
- Phylum: Chordata
- Class: Mammalia
- Infraclass: Placentalia
- Order: Rodentia
- Superfamily: Chinchilloidea
- Family: Chinchillidae; Bennett, 1833

Type genus
- Chinchilla Bennett, 1829

Genera
- †Eoviscaccia †Incamys; Chinchilla; Lagidium; Lagostomus †Peruchinchilla †Pliolagostomus †Prolagostomus
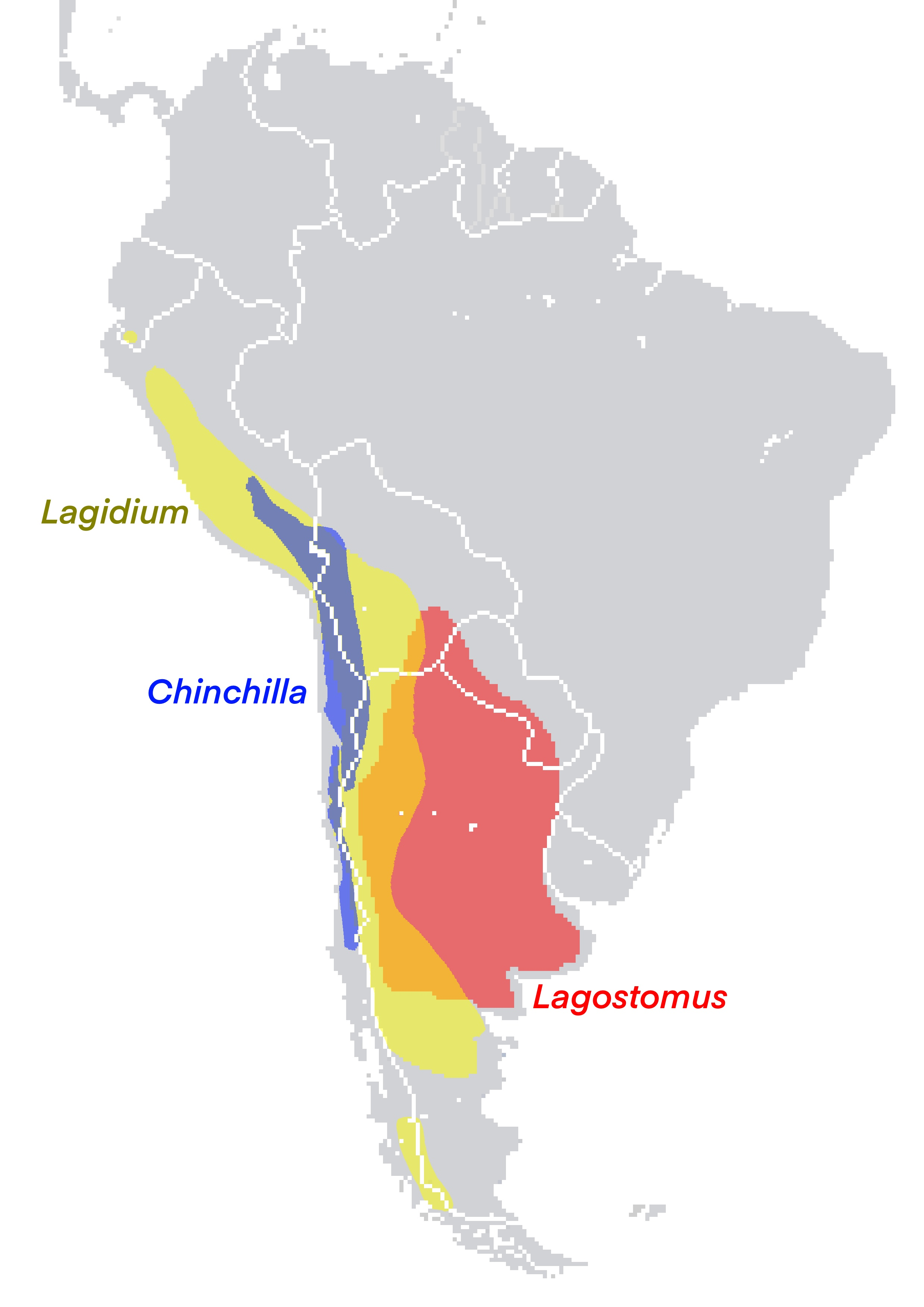

= Chinchillidae =

Chinchillidae Temporal range: Late Oligocene–Recent

Family of rodents

The family Chinchillidae is in the order Rodentia and consists of the chinchillas, the viscachas, and their fossil relatives. This family is restricted to southern and western South America, mostly living in mountainous regions of the Andes, except one species living on plains. They are medium to large-sized rodents, weighing from 800 g (28 oz) to 8 kg (18 lb), with strong hind legs and large ears and a bushy tail. All species have thick, soft fur, which is considered valuable in some cultures.

== Characteristics ==
Members of the family Chinchillidae are somewhat rabbit or squirrel-like rodents varying in weight from 0.5 to 8 kilograms (1.1 to 17.6 lb). They have large eyes, medium-sized ears, soft dense fur and short bushy tails. The forelegs are shorter than the hind legs. The forefeet have four toes while the hind feet have four small-clawed toes in Lagidium and Chinchilla but three large-clawed toes in Lagostomus, a digging species. Their dental formula is 1.0.1.31.0.1.3 and their incisors grow continually throughout their lives. Chinchillids are generally brownish-grey or grey on the dorsal (upper) surface and pale on the ventral (under) surface. Plains viscachas have distinctive black and white markings on their faces.

== Distribution ==
The Chinchillidae are native to South America. Chinchillas and mountain viscachas live in remote mountainous regions of Chile and Peru, on rocky surfaces and among boulders. Plains viscachas are found in the plains of Argentina, from the Gran Chaco area southwards to Patagonia.

== Behaviour ==
Members of this family are herbivorous and live in colonies of up to several hundred individuals. Plains viscachas live in extensive networks of burrows on plains where it is said that ten viscachas can eat as much as does one sheep. Mountain viscachas and chinchillas live in craggy upland regions where they inhabit crevices among rocks and are skilled climbers. Although they can jump, they mostly move about by walking or running. They use vocalizations to communicate with each other, especially the plains viscachas.

== Status ==
Both species of chinchillas are listed by the IUCN as being "critically endangered" and may be extinct in the wild. They were at one time relatively common but have been overexploited by hunters catching them for the fur trade. The plains viscacha is rated as being of "least concern" as it seems tolerant of habitat disturbance and although some populations have been eliminated locally through pest control measures and hunting, others have expanded into newly cleared areas. Both the northern and southern mountain viscachas are also considered of "least concern" as they have a wide range and are locally abundant in some areas.

== Classification ==
Three extant and several fossil genera are currently recognized:

- †Eoviscaccia incertae sedis
- †Incamys
- Subfamily Chinchillinae
  - Chinchilla - chinchillas
  - Lagidium - mountain viscachas
  - †Peruchinchilla
- Subfamily Lagostominae
  - Lagostomus - plains viscachas
  - †Pliolagostomus
  - †Prolagostomus
