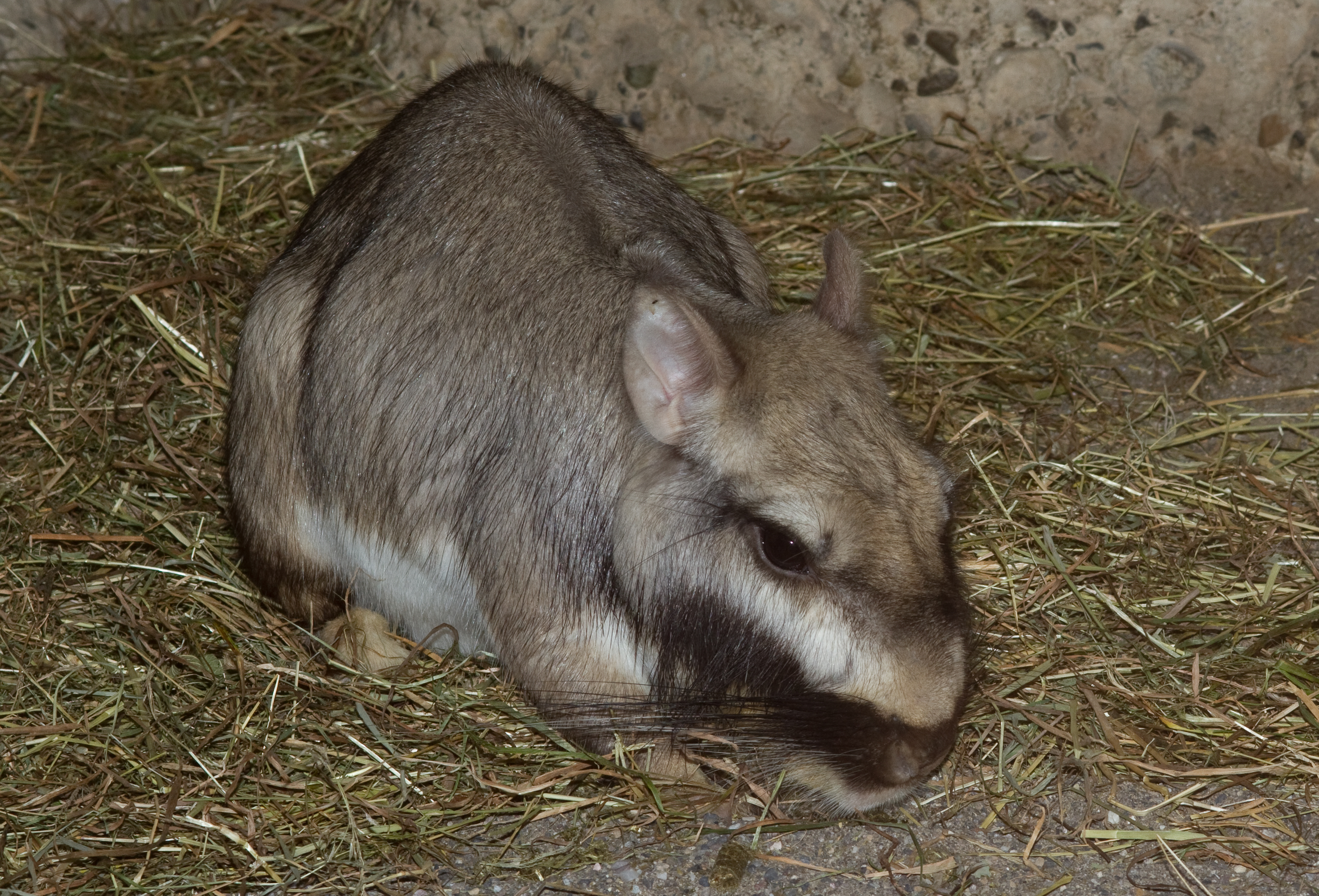

Conservation status
- Least Concern (IUCN 3.1)

Scientific classification
- Kingdom: Animalia
- Phylum: Chordata
- Class: Mammalia
- Order: Rodentia
- Family: Chinchillidae
- Genus: Lagostomus
- Species: L. maximus

Binomial name
- Lagostomus maximus (Desmarest, 1817)
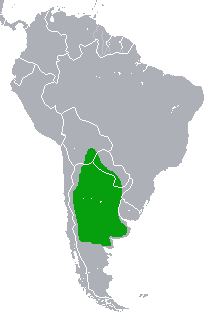
- Plains viscacha distribution

= Plains viscacha =

Species of rodent

The plains viscacha or plains vizcacha (Lagostomus maximus) is a species of viscacha, a rodent in the family Chinchillidae. It is the only living species within the genus Lagostomus. It is found in Argentina, Bolivia, and Paraguay. The plains viscacha is the largest species in its family. They construct elaborate burrows that house successive colonies for decades.

== Appearance ==
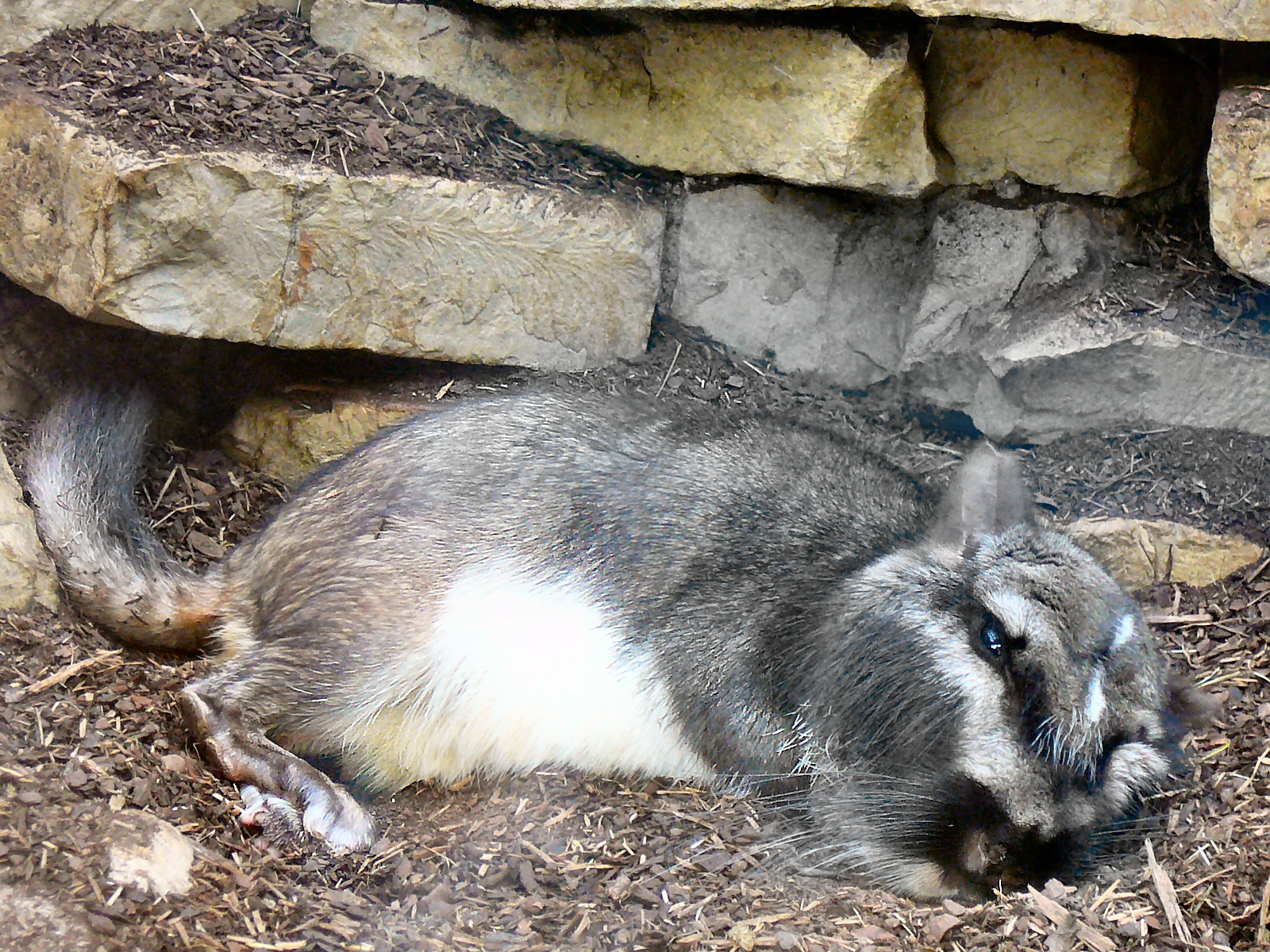
Viscacha resting. Wilhelma Zoo, Stuttgart, Germany

The plains viscacha is a large rodent, weighing up to 9 kg. It has an average head and body length over 500 mm, with the tail usually a little less than 200 mm long. The dorsal pelage ranges from gray to brown, depending upon soil color, and the belly is whitish. Its head is bulky, and the face is black and white; males have distinctive black mustaches and stiff whiskers. Their fore feet have four toes, and the hind feet have three toes. Soft dense fur covers its body, from the tips of its ears to the end of its long, curled tail. The forelimbs are relatively short, while the contrastingly long and muscular hind limbs enable it run and jump with ease. The colour of its fur varies seasonally and with age, but generally the upperparts are grey to brown, with tints of cream and black, while the underparts are pale yellow or tan.

== Ecology and behavior ==
They live in communal burrow systems in groups containing one or more males, several females, and immatures. Viscachas forage in groups at night and aggregate underground during the day. All members of a group use burrows throughout the communal burrow system and participate in digging at the burrows. Alarm calls are given primarily by adult males. The long-term social unit of the plains viscacha is the female group. Resident males disappear each year and new males join groups of females. Viscachas live in colonies that range from a few individuals to hundreds. To keep up with the colony chatter, they have acquired an impressive repertoire of vocalizations that are used in social interactions. Dominance is absent among females. Members of a social group share a common foraging area around the communal burrow system, and feed on a variety of grasses and forbs, occasionally browsing on low shrubs. They collect branches and heavy objects to cover the burrow entrance. When they live close to human settlements, tend to hoard brooms, tables, garden tools, firewood, trinkets, pieces of concrete, and many human-made objects to cover the burrow.

== Subspecies ==
The species subspecies include:

- L. m. inmollis
- L. m. maximus
- L. m. peltilidens

== Conservation ==
No known conservation measures are currently in place for the plains viscacha; however, it does occur in several protected areas. Although hunting is not currently considered a major threat to this species, it needs to be monitored in case it starts to have a severe impact on the population.
