= Environmental risk transition =

Environmental risk transition is the process by which traditional communities with associated environmental health issues become more economically developed and experience new health issues. In traditional or economically undeveloped regions, humans often suffer and die from infectious diseases or of malnutrition due to poor food, water, and air quality. As economic development occurs, these environmental issues are reduced or solved, and others begin to arise. There is a shift in the character of these environmental changes, and as a result, a shift in causes of death and disease.

== Risk transition framework ==
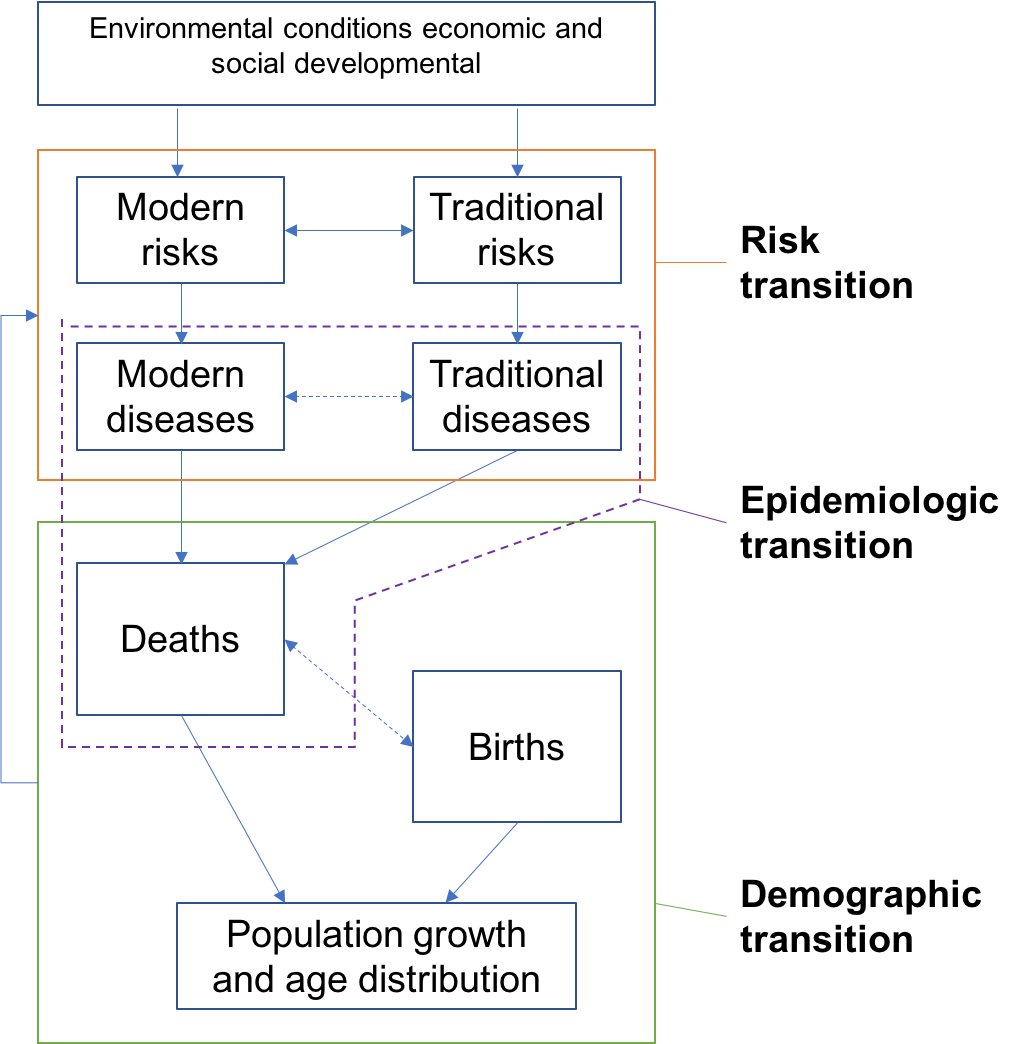
Figure 1. Relationship between demographic, epidemiological, and environmental risk transitions

Several transition frameworks have been established to better understand the impacts of socioeconomic development. Of these, the oldest and most well-known framework is the Demographic transition framework, which was established in the 1940s. This describes the shift from high fertility and high mortality in underdeveloped societies to lower fertility and mortality rates as a result of development. Then around 1970, the Epidemiological transition framework was used to characterize changes in the health of societies during development. To better categorize causes of death and disease when studying the epidemiological shifts more well-defined categories were created to describe illnesses and injuries:

1. I. Traditional, infectious, nutritional, perinatal, and maternal causes
2. II. Modern, cancer, heart, neuro-psychiatric, chronic lung, diabetes, and congenital causes
3. III. Non-transitional injuries, both unintentional and intentional

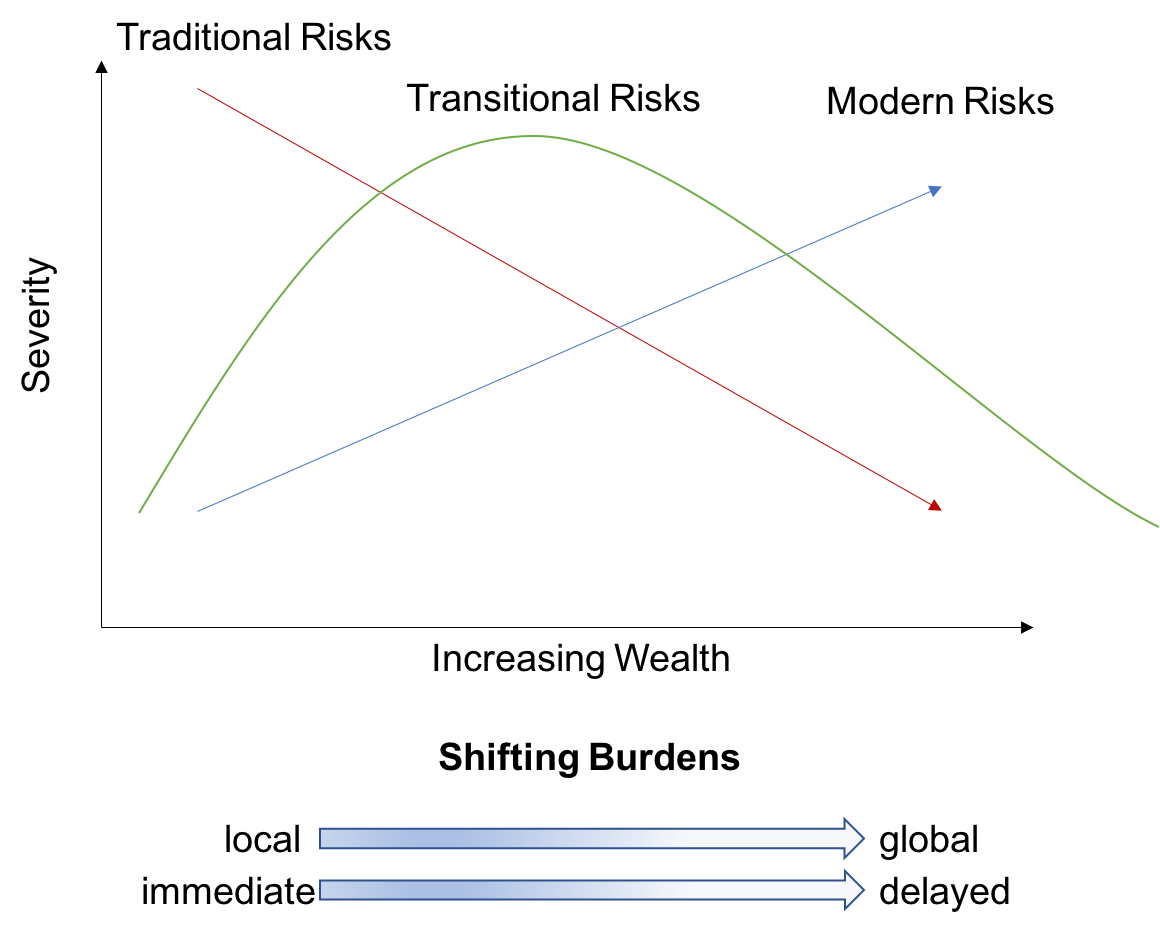
Figure 2. This illustrates the overall environmental risk transition framework, with traditional risks such as household sanitation decreasing, modern global risks such as global warming increasing, and transitional community risks, such as urban pollution rising, then falling as societies become more wealthy and developed.

In 1990, environmental health researcher Kirk R. Smith at the University of California, Berkeley proposed the "risk transition" framework in relation to the established demographic and epidemiological transition frameworks. This theory was based on the concept that there must be a shift in risk factors leading up to a shift in causes of death and disease. In efforts to prevent, rather than respond to diseases, the risk transition was further studied and quantified. Figure 1 shows the relationship between risk, epidemiological, and demographic transition, in which risk factors change to affect patterns of disease and health, which in turn affects the demographic. However, a shift in population also impacts the risk factors, and so these three frameworks all show significant impact on one another.

The "environmental risk transition" framework further developed by Smith then more specifically categorizes the risks as traditional and modern as well as spatially. Based on the framework, during the first stages of development, environmental health issues concentrated in the household, such as poor sanitation, are resolved by shifting them into the community, causing issues such urban pollution. This can be labeled as traditional and modern risks, respectively. Then, upon further development, these risks in the community are decreased and shifted to the global environment, creating concern for changes such as heightened greenhouse gas emissions, etc. Modern risks, in contrast to traditional risks, tend to be accrued over time in which adverse effects do not have single identifiable causes. These categorizations were made since it was found that the majority of environmental risks associated with category I diseases presented itself in the household, and as these were resolved with development, the impact of environmental causes of category II diseases became more significant and emerged at the community level. This concept is illustrated in Figure 2.

== Quantifying ==
Utilizing data from the Global Burden of Disease Study (GBD) and the Comparative Risk Assessment (CRA) managed by the World Health Organization (WHO), empirical data was gathered to test the environmental risk transition framework.

=== Measuring development ===
Well established metrics of quantifying development in a society include income per capita adjusted for local purchasing power in 2000. This is termed dollars of gross domestic product/capita, adjusted for purchasing power ($PPP/capita). Similarly, the Human Development Index (HDO), utilizes a combination of purchasing power income per capita, life expectancy, and education level in 2000 to measure development in a population.

=== Risk metric ===
To understand the effects of environmental risks internationally, a per capita measure of a risk factor's impact is more useful, so risks were quantified in percent of total disease burden measured in % Disability-adjusted life years (DALYs) and burden per capita (DALYs per 1000 capita).

==== Household ====
The following summarizes the three major environmental risks present in households with young children most at risk:

- Poor water, sanitation, and hygiene significantly contribute to cases of diarrhea.
- Solid fuel use, such as biomass or coal used for cooking and heating emit pollutants that contribute to acute lower respiratory infections, chronic obstructive pulmonary disease, and lung cancer.
- Lack of household management, such as screening, pesticides, and bed nets leads to significant levels of malaria today.

With increased development as indicated in dollars of gross domestic product/capita, adjusted for purchasing power ($PPP/capita) the household environmental risks declined considerably. Between poor and rich countries as determined by $PPP/capita, there was a more than two orders of magnitude decline observed in household risks.

==== Community ====
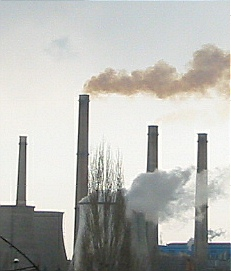
With development, pollution is expanded into the larger community as shown in the air pollution created by industrialization.

The following names major environmental risks are present at the community level:

- Urban outdoor air pollution.
- Lead pollution from gasoline and industrial sources.
- Occupational risks such as carcinogens, injuries, noise, and poor ergonomics.
- Traffic accidents for both drivers and pedestrians.

It has been found that there are more rises and falls in community risks with development in comparison to household risks, and the pattern of risk is more complicated and not as pronounced. However, a general pattern of overall rising with development, then following can be seen in traffic accidents and air pollution. Lead and occupational risks, however, displayed varying significantly.

==== Global ====
The WHO CRA only analyzed one environmental risk that presents itself at the global level:

- Climate change, which currently has relatively insignificant impact on human health.

No data was collected for other global risks such as ozone depletion and land-use changes for the project. It has been found that climate change has thus far had minimal impact on human health worldwide. However, exposure to climate change will continue to increase in future years, which may magnify prevalent risks such as malaria. Results show that risks from climate change decreased with increased development, highlighting that poorer populations are more susceptible and in contact with the diseases affected by climate change. This contradicts the environmental transition framework since it takes account of where the risk is experienced rather than where it originates from. However, it remains true, that as development proceeds, the global risk of climate change expands as well.

=== Limitations ===
Many important environmental health risks could not be addressed and analyze throughout the study. Considered, a "super distal risk factor", environmental risk factors have some influence in every disease. Thus, the study assigned at least 5% of environmental burden of disease of every disease to the environment, with larger proportions to diseases like diarrhea with direct attribution to environmental factors. With no better and reasonable method of accounting for environmental factors, the uniform 5% distribution is not realistic, but was used as a way to account for the estimated burden of environmental factors in diseases. A better understanding of the full causal web establishing various relationships between environmental and other risk factors to their respective diseases would be necessary for a more comprehensive study.

Furthermore, the study does not take into account high-consequence, low probability hazards which include natural disasters (earthquakes, tsunamis), high-impact technological failures (nuclear explosion), new and old infectious diseases caused by human activities such as trade, tourism, etc.

=== Conclusion ===
Main conclusions:

- Category I (infectious diseases) in poor countries dominates the world burden of ill health.
- There is no apparent substitution of Category II (chronic) disease for category I during development as is often instead. The data showed that both categories of diseases decreased with increased wealth.
- Category III (injuries) risks decrease with increased wealth.

A true and comprehensive test of the environmental risk transition hypothesis remains unattainable with the accessible data. However, by using the database of the WHO CRA project, a cross-sectional analysis of environmental health transition reveals some valuable takeaways:

- A significant amount of infectious diseases found in poor countries is caused by household environmental risks, as much as one fifth of all disease in poor countries.
- Household environmental risks decline significantly and nearly uniformly with development.
- Community risks account for 4.3% of the GBD, with highest rates in middle-income countries.
  - Impacts of lead and occupational risks show less consistent trends than road traffic accidents and air pollution potentially because of regulatory and technological intervention.
- Global risk from climate change accounts for 0.4% of GBD and is sharply declining with development.
  - The source of global risk however, is trending steeply upwards
- trends of environmental risk at different spatial scales generally support the environmental risk transition hypothesis.

== Risk overlap ==
In the environmental risk transition framework, there exists the concept of "risk overlap" which describes societies that experience both the traditional and modern, household and community risks simultaneously. The population that is especially susceptible to this condition is the urban slum. People tend to live in poor household environments while also affected by the contamination of the city, such as air pollution, traffic, and solid waste. Risk overlap creates interactions between different risks such as:

- Risk genesis: New risks are generated, such toxic wastes from garbage dumps.
- Risk transfer: Attempts to control one risk may cause other risks to increase in severity, such as using pesticides for disease prevention.
- Risk synergism: One risk alters the sensitivity or susceptibility to other risks, such as increased mortality of undernourished children who have limited access to health services.

These overlap situations may further concentrate the harmful effects of environment risks present in the community and deepen the burden of disease and ill-health. The poorer populations thus have to bear the brunt of the adverse environmental changes brought by development in additional to those brought by global climate change.
