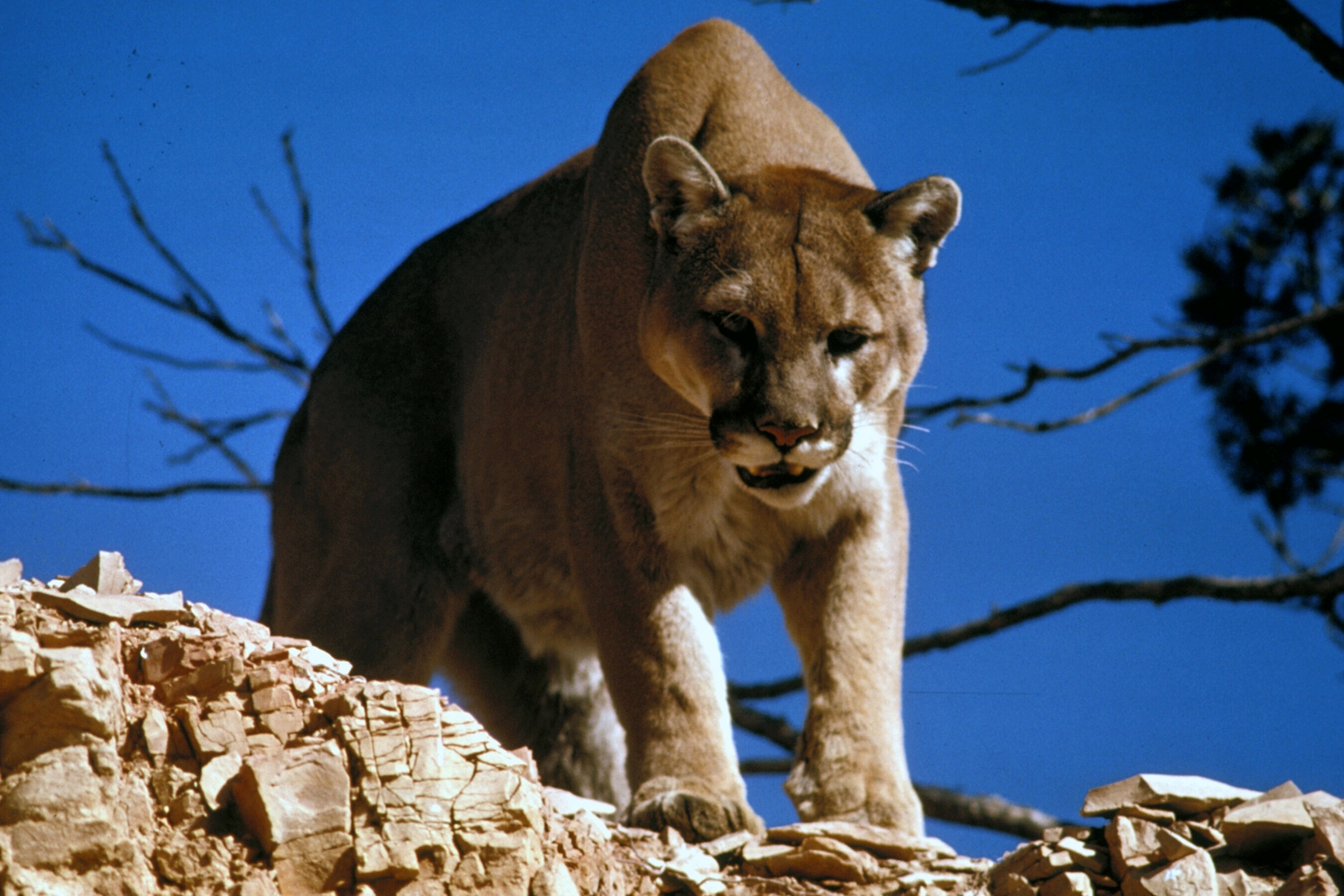
- A cougar in Glacier National Park (U.S.)

Conservation status
- Least Concern (IUCN 3.1)
- CITES Appendix II

Scientific classification
- Kingdom: Animalia
- Phylum: Chordata
- Class: Mammalia
- Order: Carnivora
- Family: Felidae
- Subfamily: Felinae
- Genus: Puma
- Species: P. concolor

Binomial name
- Puma concolor (Linnaeus, 1771)

Subspecies
- P. c. concolor; P. c. couguar; Also see text
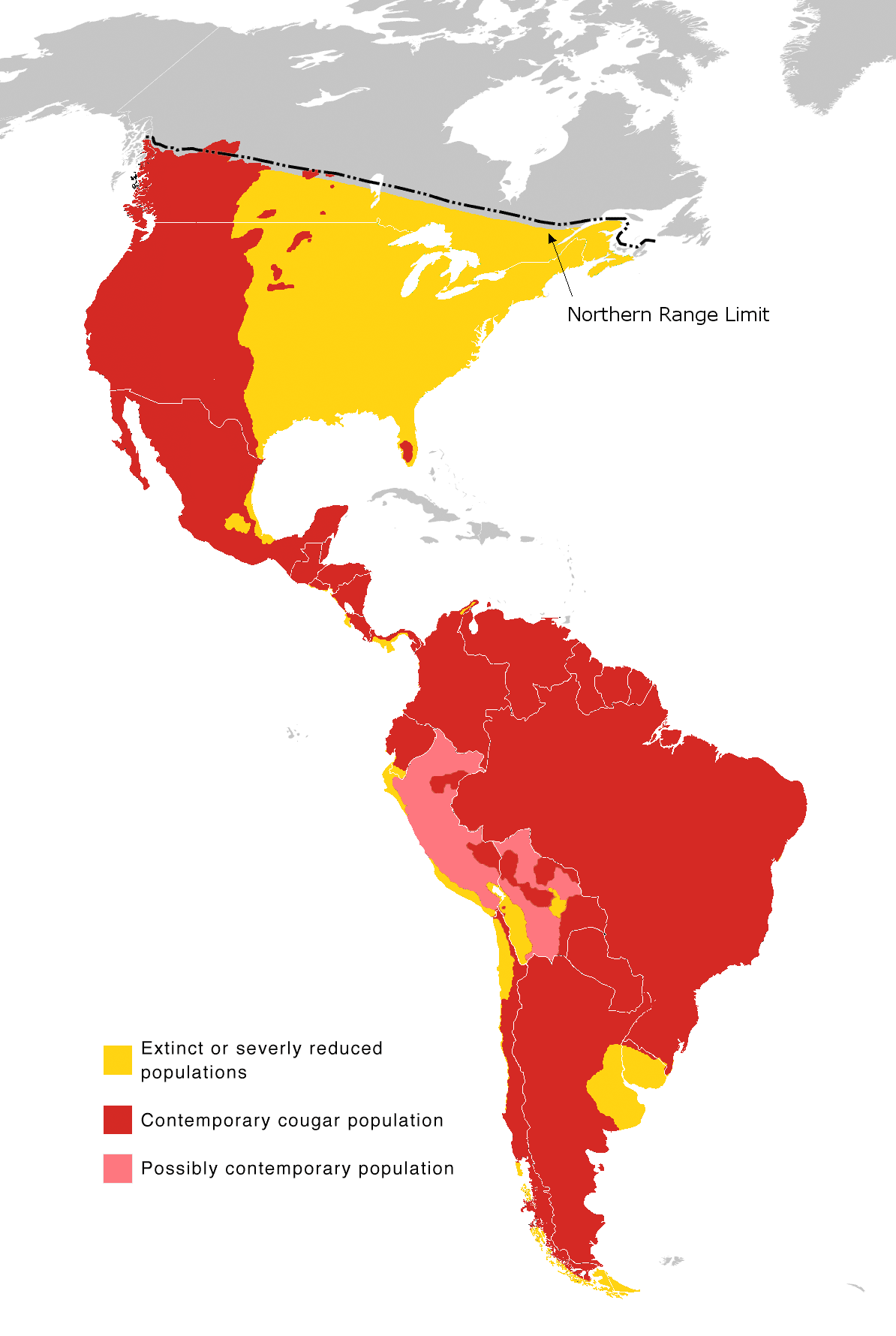
- Cougar range (without recent confirmations across northern Canadian territories, eastern U.S. states, and Alaska)

= Cougar =

Cougar Temporal range: 1.2–0 Ma Early Pleistocene – Holocene

Wild cat species native to the Americas

The cougar ( Puma concolor; /ˈkuːɡər/ KOO-gər), also called puma, mountain lion, catamount and panther, is a large feline species native to the Americas. It inhabits North, Central and South America, making it the most widely distributed wild, terrestrial mammal in the Western Hemisphere, and one of the most widespread in the world. Its range spans Yukon, British Columbia and Alberta in Canada, the Rocky Mountains and areas in the western United States. Further south, its range extends through Mexico to the Amazon rainforest and the southern Andes Mountains in Patagonia. It is an adaptable generalist species, occurring in most American habitat types. It prefers habitats with dense underbrush and rocky areas for stalking but also lives in open areas.

The cougar is largely solitary. Its activity pattern varies from diurnality and cathemerality to crepuscularity and nocturnality between protected and non-protected areas, and is apparently correlated with the presence of other predators, prey species, livestock and humans. It is an ambush predator that pursues a wide variety of prey. Ungulates, particularly deer, are its primary prey, but it also hunts rodents. It is territorial and lives at low population densities. Individual home ranges depend on terrain, vegetation and abundance of prey. While large, it is not always the dominant apex predator in its range, yielding prey to other predators. It is reclusive and mostly avoids people. Fatal attacks on humans are rare but increased in North America as more people entered cougar habitat and built farms.

The cougar is listed as Least Concern on the IUCN Red List. Intensive hunting following European colonization of the Americas and ongoing human development into cougar habitat has caused populations to decline in most parts of its historical range. In particular, the eastern cougar population is considered to be mostly locally extinct in eastern North America since the early 20th century, with the exception of the isolated Florida panther subpopulation.

== Naming and etymology ==
The cougar holds the Guinness record for the animal with the greatest number of names, with over 40 in English alone. The word cougar is borrowed from the Portuguese çuçuarana, via French, derived from the Tupi language. A form in Brazil is suçuarana. In the 17th century, Georg Marcgrave named it cuguacu ara. Marcgrave's rendering was reproduced in 1648 by his associate Willem Piso. Cuguacu ara was then adopted by John Ray in 1693. In 1774, Georges-Louis Leclerc, Comte de Buffon converted cuguacu ara to cuguar, which was later modified to "cougar" in English. Gaelic, or Erse, has similar (likely unrelated) words, including Scottish Gaelic cugar and cugarbhad (a wild or domesticated male cat; also signifying a hero, gallant, or champion). The usual Gaelic for cat is "cat" (with Cú or Coin signifying a canid).

The name puma is the most common name used in the global scientific literature. Puma is the common name used in Latin America and most parts of Europe and is occasionally used in the United States. The first use of puma in English dates to 1777, introduced from Spanish from the Quechua language.

In the United States, the name mountain lion is commonly used, and in Canada, the name cougar is most commonly used. The earliest English reference to them is from 1505, when explorers from Bristol brought back 'catts of the mountayne' / 'wylde catts' to Henry VII from North America. The former term mirrors the name used by the earliest Spanish explorers: 'gato monte' (cat of the mountain). The name catamount, a shortening of name "cat of the mountain", has also been in English use for Puma concolor and other wild cats since at least 1664. The term mountain lion was first seen in writing in 1858.

Puma concolor is not a true lion of the genus Panthera and cannot roar, nor is its habitat restricted to mountainous regions. Panther is often used synonymously with cougar, puma or mountain lion. The name painter is also sometimes used instead of panther, mostly in the southern United States.

== Taxonomy and evolution ==
Felis concolor was the scientific name proposed by Carl Linnaeus in 1771 for a cat with a long tail from Brazil. It was placed in the genus Puma by William Jardine in 1834. This genus is part of the Felinae. The cougar is most closely related to the jaguarundi and the cheetah.

=== Subspecies ===
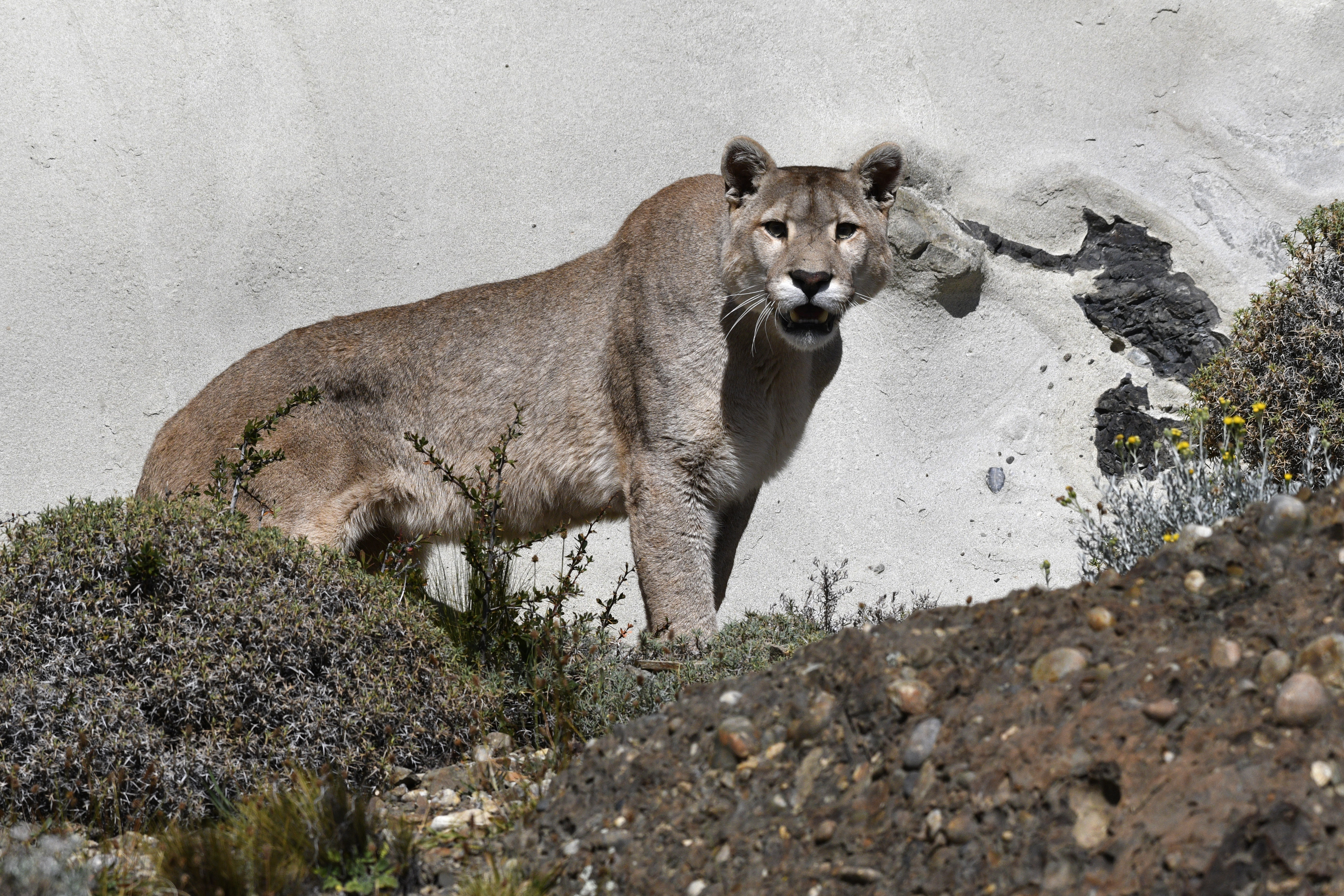
South American cougar at Torres del Paine National Park, in the Chilean part of Patagonia

Following Linnaeus's first scientific description of the cougar, 32 cougar zoological specimens were described and proposed as subspecies until the late 1980s. Genetic analysis of cougar mitochondrial DNA indicates that many of these are too similar to be recognized as distinct at a molecular level but that only six phylogeographic groups exist. The Florida panther samples showed a low microsatellite variation, possibly due to inbreeding. Following this research, the authors of Mammal Species of the World recognized the following six subspecies in 2005:

- P. c. concolor (Linnaeus, 1771) includes the synonyms bangsi, incarum, osgoodi, soasoaranna, sussuarana, soderstromii, suçuaçuara, and wavula
- P. c. puma (Molina, 1782) includes the synonyms araucanus, concolor, patagonica, pearsoni, and puma (Trouessart, 1904)
- P. c. couguar (Kerr, 1792) includes arundivaga, aztecus, browni, californica, floridana, hippolestes, improcera, kaibabensis, mayensis, missoulensis, olympus, oregonensis, schorgeri, stanleyana, vancouverensis, and youngi
- P. c. costaricensis (Merriam, 1901)
- P. c. anthonyi (Nelson and Goldman, 1931) includes acrocodia, borbensis, capricornensis, concolor, greeni, and nigra
- P. c. cabrerae Pocock, 1940 includes hudsonii and puma proposed by Marcelli in 1922

In 2006, the Florida panther was still referred to as a distinct subspecies P. c. coryi in research works.

As of 2017, the Cat Classification Taskforce of the Cat Specialist Group recognizes only two subspecies as valid:

- P. c. concolor in South America, possibly excluding the region northwest of the Andes
- P. c. couguar in North and Central America and possibly northwestern South America

=== Evolution ===
- - - - Lynx lineage
        Lynx
    - - - Puma lineage
          - Acinonyx
            Cheetah A. jubatus
          - - Puma
              Cougar
            - Herpailurus
              Jaguarundi H. yagouaroundi
      - - Domestic cat lineage
          Felis
        - Leopard cat lineage
          - Otocolobus
          - Prionailurus

The Puma lineage of the family Felidae, depicted along with closely related genera

The family Felidae is thought to have originated in Asia about 11 million years ago; taxonomic research on felids remains partial, and much of what is known about their evolutionary history is based on mitochondrial DNA analysis. Significant confidence intervals exist with suggested dates. In the latest genomic study of the Felidae, the common ancestor of today's Leopardus, Lynx, Puma, Prionailurus, and Felis lineages migrated across the Bering land bridge into the Americas 8 to 8.5 million years ago. The lineages subsequently diverged in that order. North American felids then invaded South America 2 to 4 million years ago as part of the Great American Interchange, following the formation of the Isthmus of Panama.

The cheetah lineage is suggested by some studies to have diverged from the Puma lineage in the Americas and migrated back to Asia and Africa, while other research suggests the cheetah diverged in the Old World itself. A high level of genetic similarity has been found among North American cougar populations, suggesting they are all fairly recent descendants of a small ancestral group. Culver et al. propose the original North American cougar population was locally extinct during the Pleistocene extinctions some 10,000 years ago, when other large mammals, such as Smilodon, also disappeared. North America was then repopulated by South American cougars. Cougars in North America might have survived the Late Pleistocene megafaunal extinction due to their greater dietary flexibility as evidenced by dental microwear texture analysis.

A coprolite identified as from a cougar was excavated in Argentina's Catamarca Province and dated to 17,002–16,573 years old. It contained Toxascaris leonina eggs. This finding indicates that the cougar and the parasite have existed in South America since at least the Late Pleistocene. The oldest fossil record of a cougar (Puma concolor) in South America (Argentina) is a partial skull from the late Calabrian age.

== Characteristics ==
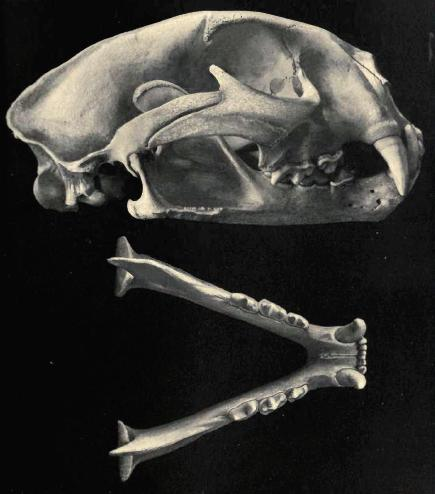
Cougar skull and jawbone

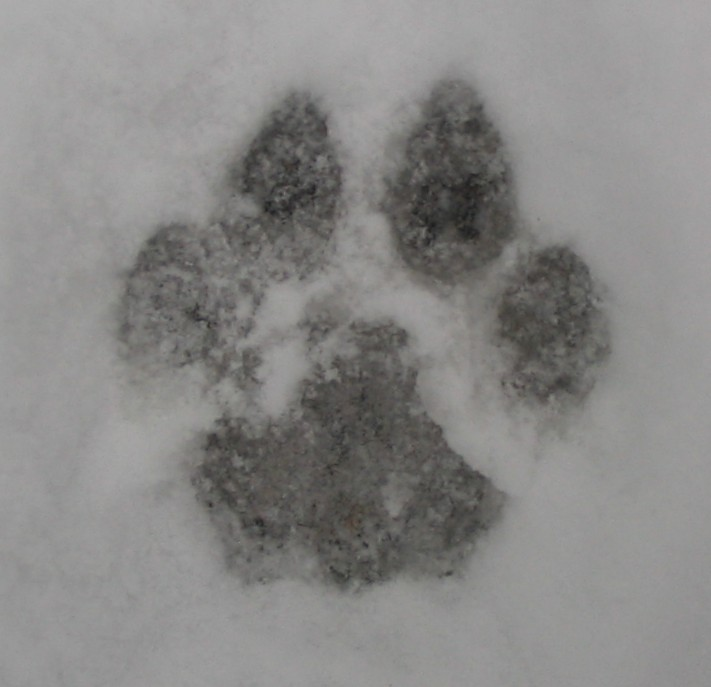
Front paw print of a cougar

The head of the cougar is round, and the ears are erect. Its powerful forequarters, neck, and jaw serve to grasp and hold large prey. It has four retractile claws on its hind paws and five on its forepaws, of which one is a dewclaw. The larger front feet and claws are adaptations for clutching prey.

The cougar is slender and agile. It is the fourth largest cat species; adults stand about 60 to 90 cm (24 to 35 in) tall at the shoulders. Adult males are around 2.4 m (7 ft 10 in) long from nose to tail tip, and females average 2.05 m (6 ft 9 in), with overall ranges between 1.50 to 2.75 m (4 ft 11 in to 9 ft 0 in) nose to tail suggested for the species in general. Of this length, the tail typically accounts for 63 to 95 cm (25 to 37 in). Males generally weigh 53–72 kg (117–159 lb) but up to 120 kg (260 lb), and females weigh 34–48 kg (75–106 lb); the cougar's size is smaller close to the equator and larger towards the poles.

The largest recorded cougar, shot in 1901, weighed 105.2 kg (232 lb); claims of 125.2 kg (276 lb) and 118 kg (260 lb) have been reported, though they were probably exaggerated. Male cougars in North America average 62 kg (137 lb), while the average female in the same region averages about 42 kg (93 lb). On average, adult male cougars in British Columbia weigh 56.7 kg (125 lb) and adult females 45.4 kg (100 lb), though several male cougars in British Columbia weighed between 86.4 and 95.5 kg (190 and 211 lb).

Depending on the locality, cougars can be smaller or bigger than jaguars but are less muscular and not as powerfully built, so on average, their weight is less. Whereas the size of cougars tends to increase as much as distance from the equator increases, which crosses the northern portion of South America, jaguars are generally smaller north of the Amazon River in South America and larger south of it. For example, while South American jaguars are comparatively large, and may exceed 90 kg (200 lb), North American jaguars in Mexico's Chamela-Cuixmala Biosphere Reserve weigh approximately 50 kg (110 lb), about the same as female cougars.

Cougar coloring is plain tawny, ranging from silvery-grey to reddish with lighter patches on the underbody, including the jaws, chin, and throat. Kittens are spotted and born with blue eyes and rings on their tails; juveniles are pale, and dark spots remain on their flanks. A leucistic individual was seen in Serra dos Órgãos National Park in Rio de Janeiro in 2013 when it was recorded by a camera trap, indicating that pure white individuals do exist within the species, though they are extremely rare.

The cougar has large paws and proportionally the largest hind legs in Felidae, allowing for great leaping and powerful short sprints. It can leap from the ground up to 5.5 m (18 ft) high into a tree. It is the largest of the Felinae that is capable of purring.

== Distribution and habitat ==
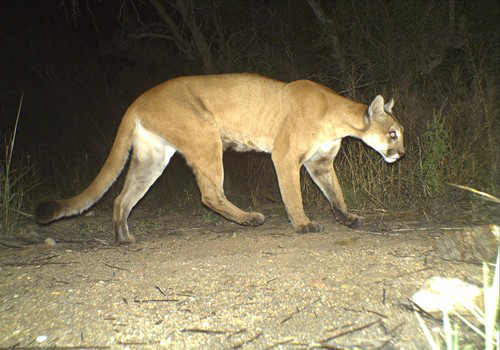
A camera trap image of a cougar in Saguaro National Park, Arizona

The cougar has the most extensive range of any wild land animal in the Americas, spanning 110 degrees of latitude from the Yukon in Canada to the southern Andes in Chile. It is recolonizing its former range in both the midwestern US and Canada, and isolated populations have been documented east of the contemporary ranges. A small breeding population has been re-established in the Great Lakes region around Voyageurs National Park and the Upper Peninsula of Michigan; juveniles were observed in 2025 and 2026.

The cougar lives in all forest types, lowland and mountainous deserts, and in open areas with little vegetation up to an elevation of 5,800 m (19,000 ft). In the Santa Ana Mountains, it prefers steep canyons, escarpments, rim rocks and dense brush. In Mexico, it was recorded in the Sierra de San Carlos. In the Yucatán Peninsula, it inhabits secondary and semi-deciduous forests in El Eden Ecological Reserve. In El Salvador, it was recorded in the lower montane forest in Montecristo National Park and in a river basin in the Morazán Department above 700 m (2,300 ft) in 2019. In Colombia, it was recorded in a palm oil plantation close to a riparian forest in the Llanos Basin, and close to water bodies in the Magdalena River Valley. In the human-modified landscape of central Argentina, it inhabits bushland with abundant vegetation cover and prey species.

== Behavior and ecology ==
The cougar is a keystone species in Western Hemisphere ecosystems as it links numerous species at many trophic levels, interacting with 485 other species as food source and prey, carcass remains left behind, and competitive effects on other predators in shared habitat.

=== Hunting and diet ===
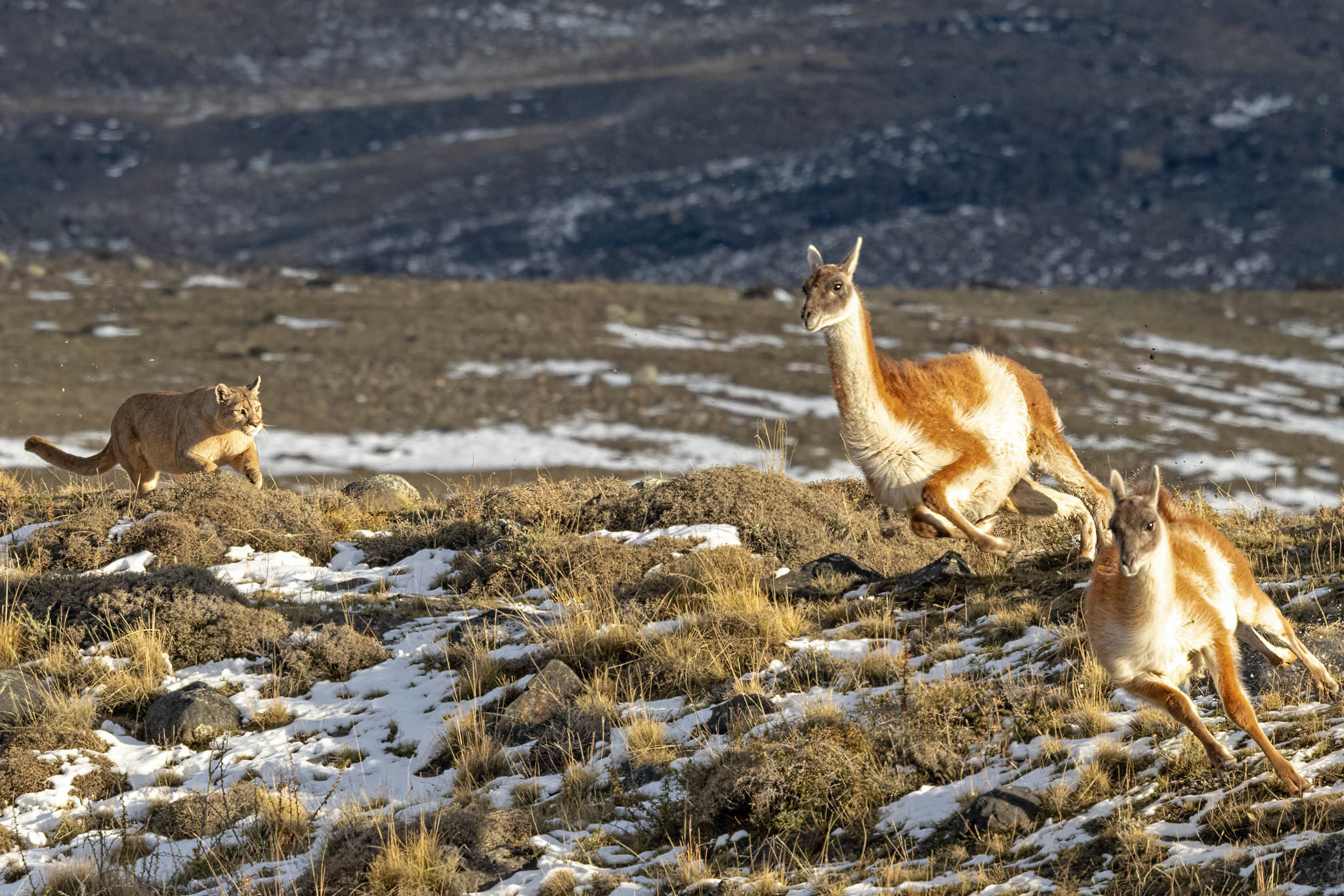
P. c. concolor hunting guanaco, in Última Esperanza, Chile

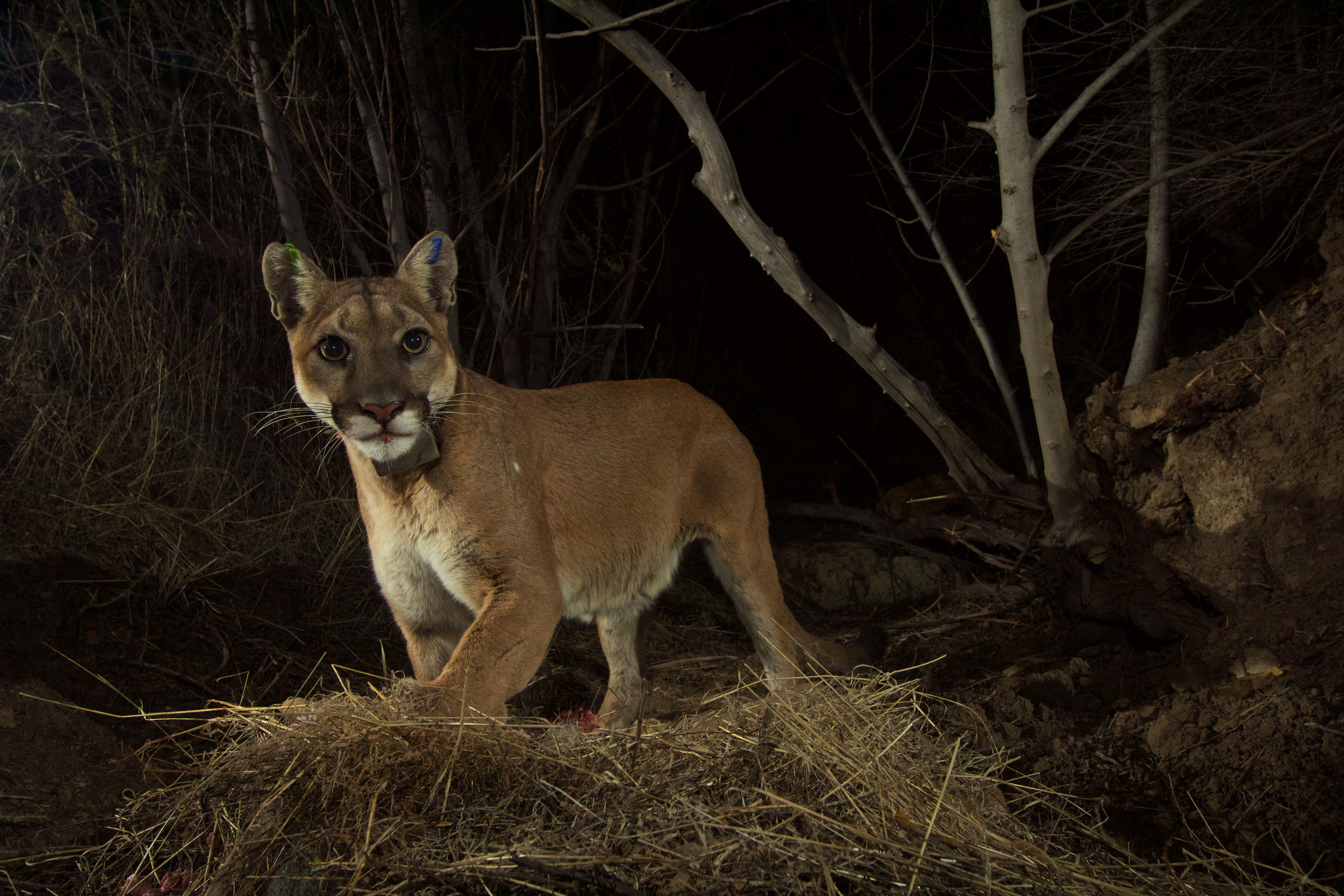
Camera trap image of cougar in the Santa Susana Mountains northwest of Los Angeles

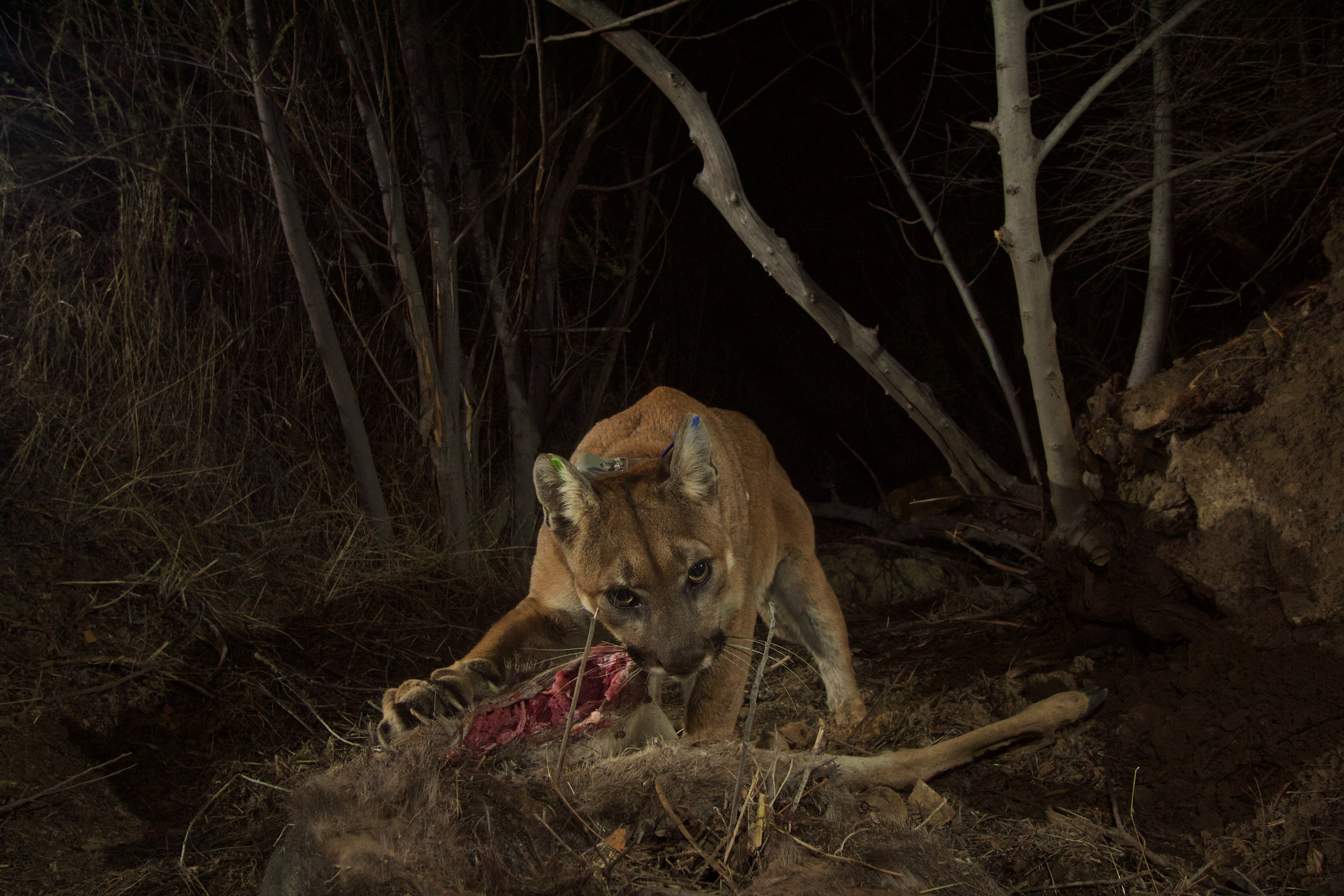
Cougar with deer kill

The cougar is a generalist hypercarnivore. It prefers large mammals such as mule deer, white-tailed deer, elk, moose, mountain goat and bighorn sheep. It opportunistically takes smaller prey such as rodents, lagomorphs, smaller carnivores, birds, and even domestic animals, including pets. The mean weight of cougar vertebrate prey increases with its body weight and is lower in areas closer to the equator. A survey of North America research found 68% of prey items were ungulates, especially deer. Only the Florida panther showed variation, often preferring feral hogs and armadillos. Cougars have been known to prey on introduced gemsbok populations in New Mexico. One individual cougar was recorded as hunting 29 gemsbok, which made up 58% of its recorded kills. Most gemsbok kills were neonates, but some adults were also known to have been taken. Elsewhere in the southwestern United States, they have been recorded to also prey on feral horses in the Great Basin, as well as feral donkeys in the Sonoran and Mojave Deserts.

Investigations at Yellowstone National Park showed that elk and mule deer were the cougar's primary prey; the prey base is shared with the park's wolves, with which the cougar competes for resources. A study on winter kills from November to April in Alberta showed that ungulates accounted for greater than 99% of the cougar diet. Learned, individual prey recognition was observed, as some cougars rarely killed bighorn sheep, while others relied heavily on the species.

In the Central and South American cougar range area, the ratio of deer in the diet declines. Small to mid-sized mammals, including large rodents such as the capybara, are preferred. Ungulates accounted for only 35% of prey items in one survey, about half that of North America. Competition with the larger jaguar in South America has been suggested for the decline in the size of prey items. In Central or North America, the cougar and jaguar share the same prey, depending on its abundance. Other listed prey species of the cougar include mice, porcupines, American beavers, raccoons, hares, guanacoes, peccaries, vicuñas, rheas and wild turkeys. Birds and small reptiles are sometimes preyed upon in the south, but this is rarely recorded in North America. Magellanic penguins (Spheniscus magellanicus) constitute the majority of prey items in cougar diet in Patagonia's Bosques Petrificados de Jaramillo National Park and Monte León National Park.

Although capable of sprinting, the cougar is typically an ambush predator. It stalks through brush and trees, across ledges, or other covered spots, before delivering a powerful leap onto the back of its prey and a suffocating neck bite. The cougar can break the neck of some of its smaller prey with a strong bite and momentum bearing the animal to the ground. Kills are generally estimated around one large ungulate every two weeks. The period shrinks for females raising young, and may be as short as one kill every three days when cubs are nearly mature around 15 months. The cat drags a kill to a preferred spot, covers it with brush, and returns to feed over a period of days. The cougar is generally reported to not be a scavenger, but deer carcasses left exposed for study were scavenged by cougars in California, suggesting more opportunistic behavior.

The cougar's hunting success rate in central Idaho was estimated at 82% hunting elk and mule deer in the snow during winter. In central Argentina, its success rate was estimated at 10% hunting Plains viscacha in semi-arid scrub areas.

=== Interactions with other predators ===
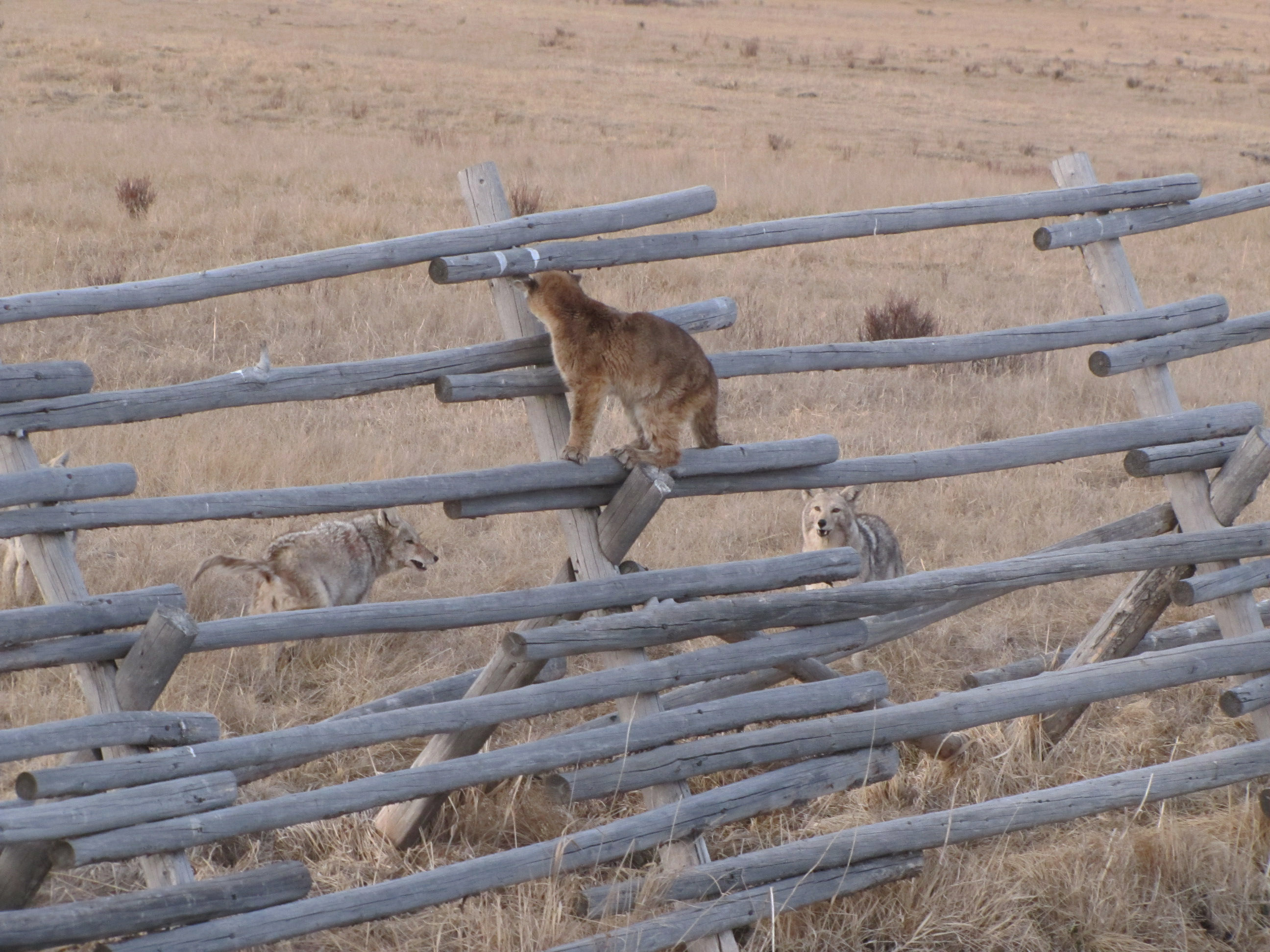
Juvenile cougar in conflict with coyotes at National Elk Refuge, using a buck-and-rail fence for refuge

Aside from humans, no species preys upon mature cougars in the wild, although conflicts with other predators or scavengers occur. Of the large predators in Yellowstone National Park – the grizzly and black bears, gray wolf and cougar – the massive grizzly bear appears dominant, often (though not always) able to drive a gray wolf pack, black bear or cougar off their kills. One study found that grizzlies and American black bears visited 24% of cougar kills in Yellowstone and Glacier National Parks, usurping 10% of carcasses. Bears gained up to 113%, and cougars lost up to 26% of their daily energy requirements from these encounters.

In Colorado and California, black bears were found to visit 48% and 77% of kills, respectively. In general, cougars are subordinate to black bears when it comes to kills, and when bears are most active, the cats take prey more frequently and spend less time feeding on each kill. Unlike several subordinate predators from other ecosystems, cougars do not appear to exploit spatial or temporal refuges to avoid competitors.

The gray wolf and the cougar compete more directly for prey, mostly in winter. Packs of wolves can steal cougars' kills, and there are some documented cases of cougars being killed by them. One report describes a large pack of seven to 11 wolves killing a female cougar and her kittens, while in nearby Sun Valley, Idaho, a 2-year-old male cougar was found dead, apparently killed by a wolf pack. Conversely, one-to-one confrontations tend to be dominated by the cat, and there are various documented accounts where wolves have been ambushed and killed, including adult male specimens. Wolves more broadly affect cougar population dynamics and distribution by dominating territory and prey opportunities, and disrupting the feline's behavior. Preliminary research in Yellowstone, for instance, has shown displacement of the cougar by wolves.

One researcher in Oregon noted: "When there is a pack around, cougars are not comfortable around their kills or raising kittens ... A lot of times a big cougar will kill a wolf, but the pack phenomenon changes the table." Both species are capable of killing mid-sized predators, such as bobcats, Canada lynxes, wolverines and coyotes, and tend to suppress their numbers. Although cougars can kill coyotes, the latter have been documented attempting to prey on cougar cubs.

The cougar and jaguar share overlapping territory in the southern portion of its range. The jaguar tends to take the larger prey where ranges overlap, reducing both the cougar's potential size and the likelihood of direct competition between the two cats. Cougars appear better than jaguars at exploiting a broader prey niche and smaller prey.

=== Social spacing and interactions ===
The cougar is a mostly solitary animal. Only mothers and kittens live in groups, with adults meeting rarely. Subadult cougars of same sexes have been known to temporarily form sibling groups. While generally loners, cougars will reciprocally share kills and seem to organize themselves into small communities defined by the territories of dominant males. Cats within these areas socialize more frequently with each other than with outsiders.

In the vicinity of a cattle ranch in northern Mexico, cougars exhibited nocturnal activity that overlapped foremost with the activity of calves. In a nature reserve in central Mexico, the activity of cougars was crepuscular and nocturnal, overlapping largely with the activity of the nine-banded armadillo (Dasypus novemcinctus). Cougars in the montane Abra-Tanchipa Biosphere Reserve in southeastern Mexico displayed a cathemeral activity pattern. Data from 12 years of camera trapping in the Pacific slope and Talamanca Cordillera of Costa Rica showed cougars as cathemeral. Both cougars and jaguars in the Cockscomb Basin of Belize were nocturnal but avoided each other. In a protected cloud forest in the central Andes of Colombia, cougars were active from late afternoon to shortly before sunrise and sometimes during noon and early afternoon. In protected areas of the Madidi-Tambopata Landscape in Bolivia and Peru, cougars were active throughout the day but with a tendency to nocturnal activity that overlapped with the activity of main prey species.

During an 8-year-long study in a modified landscape in southeastern Brazil, male cougars were primarily nocturnal, but females were active at night and day. Cougars were diurnal in the Brazilian Pantanal, but crepuscular and nocturnal in protected areas in the Cerrado, Caatinga and ecotone biomes. Cougars in the Atlantic Forest were active throughout the day but displayed peak activity during early mornings in protected areas and crepuscular and nocturnal activity in less protected areas. In central Argentina, cougars were active day and night in protected areas but were active immediately after sunset and before sunrise outside protected areas. Cougars displayed a foremost crepuscular and nocturnal activity pattern in a ranching area in southern Argentina.

Home range sizes and overall cougar abundance depend on terrain, vegetation, and prey abundance. Research suggests a lower limit of 25 km^{2} (9.7 sq mi) and upper limit of 1,300 km^{2} (500 sq mi) of home range for males. Large male home ranges of 150 to 1,000 km^{2} (58 to 386 sq mi) with female ranges half that size. One female adjacent to the San Andres Mountains was found with a big range of 215 km^{2} (83 sq mi), necessitated by poor prey abundance. Research has shown cougar abundances from 0.5 animals to as many as seven per 100 km^{2} (39 sq mi).

Male home ranges include or overlap with females but, at least where studied, not with those of other males. The home ranges of females overlap slightly. Males create scrapes composed of leaves and duff with their hind feet, and mark them with urine and sometimes feces. When males encounter each other, they vocalize and may engage in violent conflict if neither backs down.

Cougars communicate with various vocalizations. Aggressive sounds include growls, spits, snarls and hisses. During the mating season, estrus females produce caterwauls or yowls to attract mates, and males respond with similar vocals. Mothers and offspring keep in contact with whistles, chirps, and mews.

=== Reproduction and life cycle ===
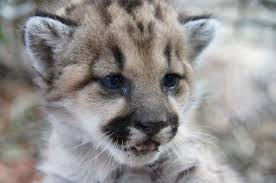
North American cougar cub in the Santa Monica Mountains

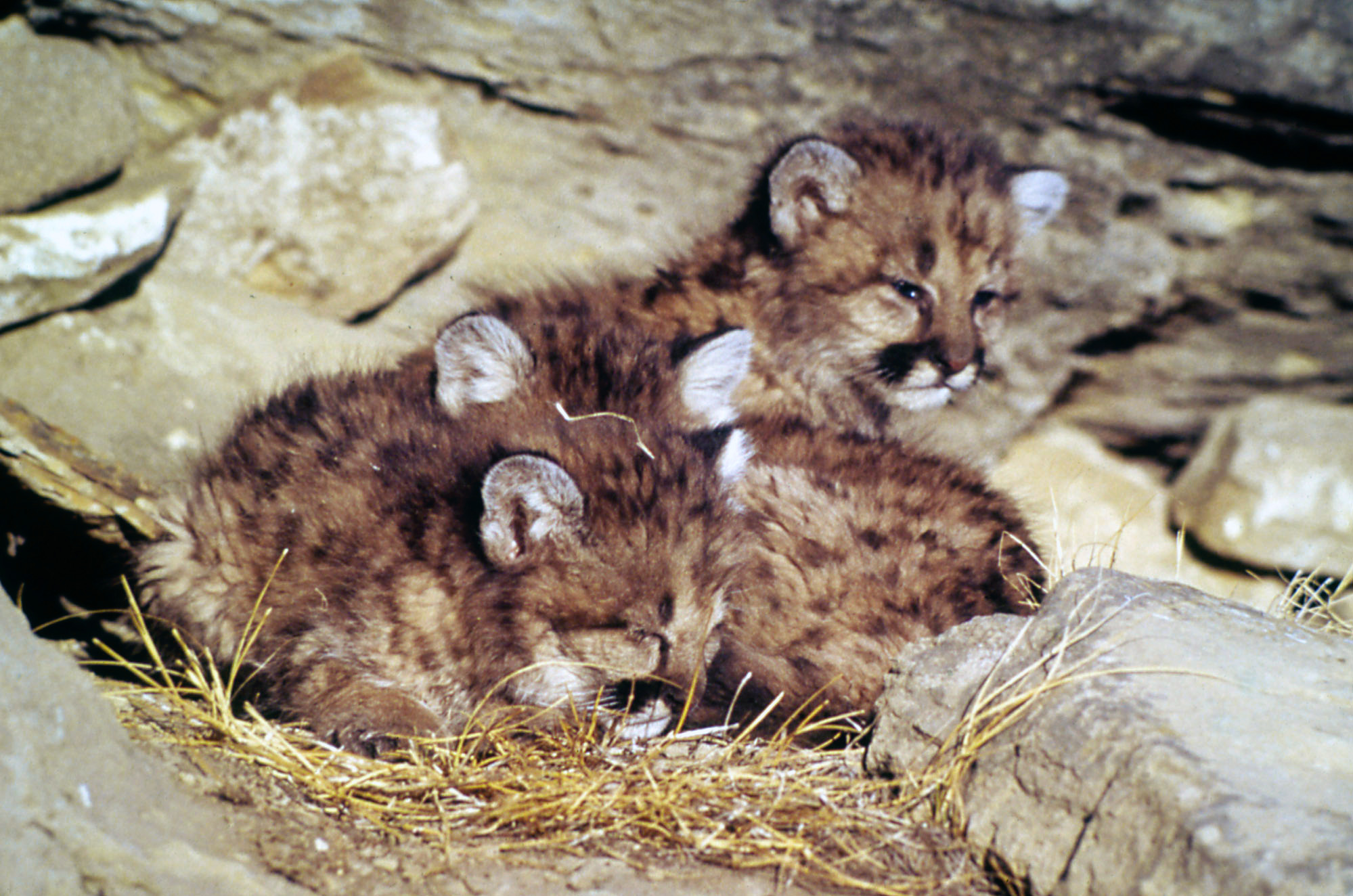
Kittens

Females reach sexual maturity at the age of 18 months to three years and are in estrus for about eight days of a 23-day cycle; the gestation period is approximately 91 days. Both adult males and females may mate with multiple partners, and a female's litter can have multiple paternities. Copulation is brief but frequent. Chronic stress can result in low reproductive rates in captivity as well as in the field.

Gestation is 82–103 days long. Only females are involved in parenting. Litter size is between one and six cubs, typically two. Caves and other alcoves that offer protection are used as litter dens. Born blind, cubs are completely dependent on their mother at first and begin to be weaned at around three months of age. As they grow, they go out on forays with their mother, first visiting kill sites and, after six months, beginning to hunt small prey on their own. Kitten survival rates are just over one per litter.

Juveniles remain with their mothers for one to two years. When a female reaches estrous again, her offspring must disperse or the male will kill them. Males tend to disperse further than females. One study has shown a high mortality rate among cougars that travel farthest from their maternal range, often due to conflicts with other cougars. In a study area in New Mexico, males dispersed farther than females, traversed large expanses of non-cougar habitat and were probably most responsible for nuclear gene flow between habitat patches.

Life expectancy in the wild is reported at 8 to 13 years and probably averages 8 to 10; a female of at least 18 years was reported killed by hunters on Vancouver Island. Cougars may live as long as 20 years in captivity. Causes of death in the wild include disability and disease, competition with other cougars, starvation, accidents, and, where allowed, hunting. The feline immunodeficiency virus is well-adapted to the cougar.

== Threats ==
The cougar has been listed as Least Concern on the IUCN Red List since 2008. It is threatened by habitat loss, habitat fragmentation, and depletion of its prey base due to poaching. Hunting is legal in the western United States. In Florida, heavy traffic causes frequent accidents involving cougars. Highways are a major barrier to the dispersal of cougars. The cougar populations in California are becoming fragmented with the increase in human population and infrastructure growth in the state.

Human–wildlife conflict in proximity of 5 km^{2} (1.9 sq mi) of cougar habitat is pronounced in areas with a median human density of 32.48 inhabitants/km^{2} (84.1 inhabitants/sq mi) and a median livestock population density of 5.3 heads/km^{2} (14 heads/sq mi). Conflict is generally lower in areas more than 16.1 km (10.0 mi) away from roads and 27.8 km (17.3 mi) away from settlements.

== Conservation ==
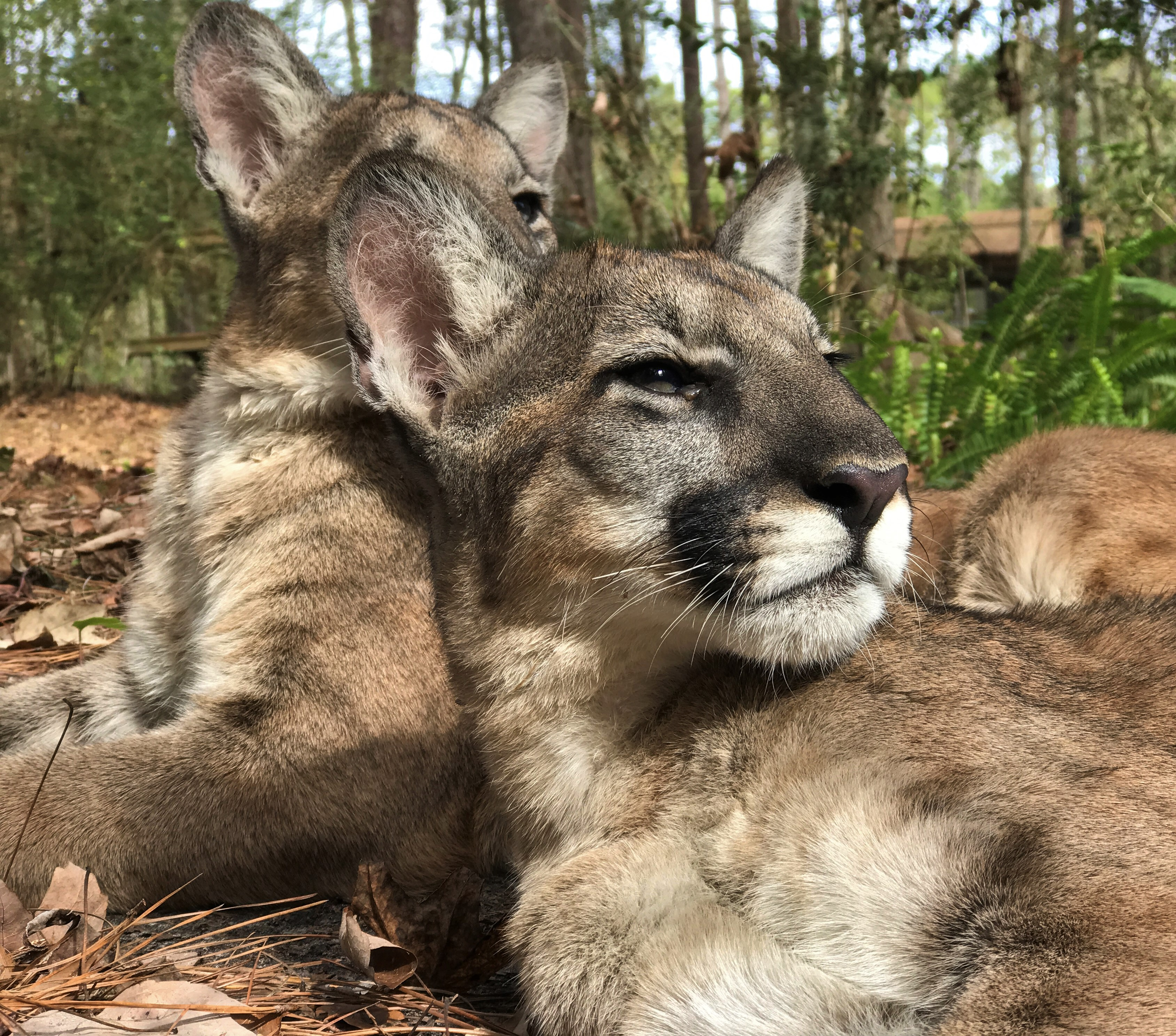
Two cougar kittens at White Oak Conservation

The cougar is listed on CITES Appendix II, but the Central American population is on Appendix I. Hunting it is prohibited in Costa Rica, Honduras, Nicaragua, Guatemala, Panama, Venezuela, Colombia, French Guiana, Suriname, Bolivia, Brazil, Chile, Paraguay, Uruguay and most of Argentina. Hunting is regulated in Canada, Mexico, Peru, and the United States. Establishing wildlife corridors and protecting sufficient range areas are critical for the sustainability of cougar populations. Research simulations showed that it faces a low extinction risk in areas larger than 2,200 km^{2} (850 sq mi). Between one and four new individuals entering a population per decade markedly increases persistence, thus highlighting the importance of habitat corridors.

The Florida panther population is afforded protection under the Endangered Species Act. In California, the cougar is protected under the California Wildlife Protection Act of 1990.

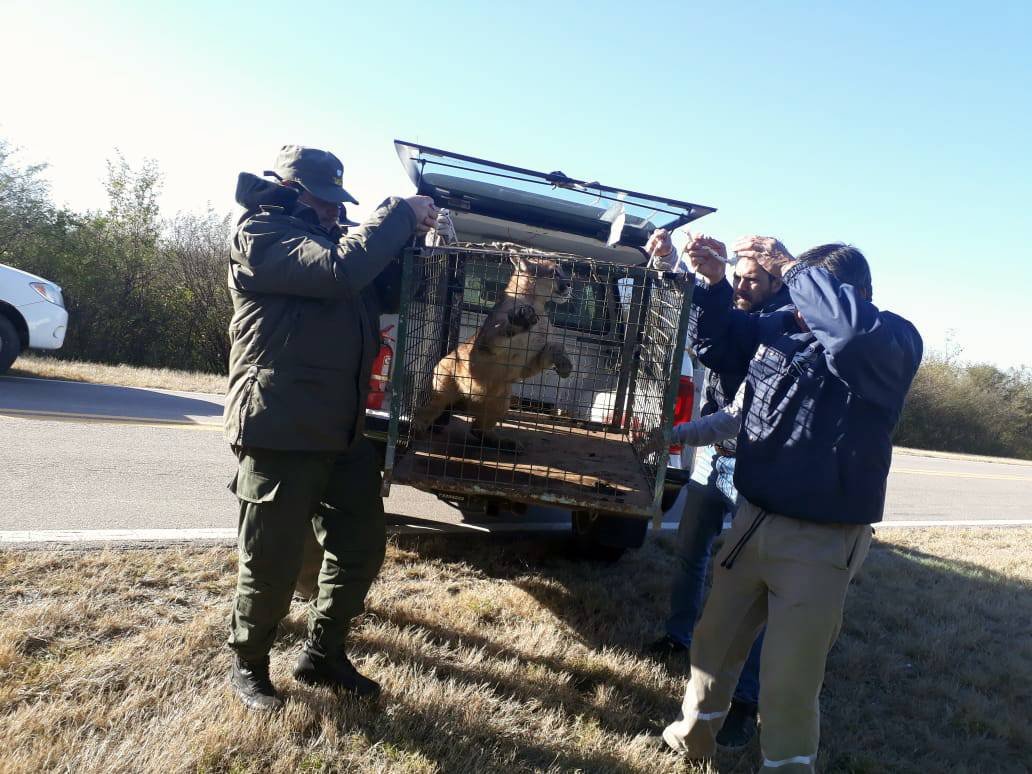
A juvenile cougar about to be released into the wild in La Rioja, Argentina

The Texas Mountain Lion Conservation Project was launched in 2009 and aimed at raising local people's awareness of the status and ecological role of the cougar and mitigating conflict between landowners and cougars.

== Relationships with humans ==
=== Attacks on humans ===
==== In North America ====
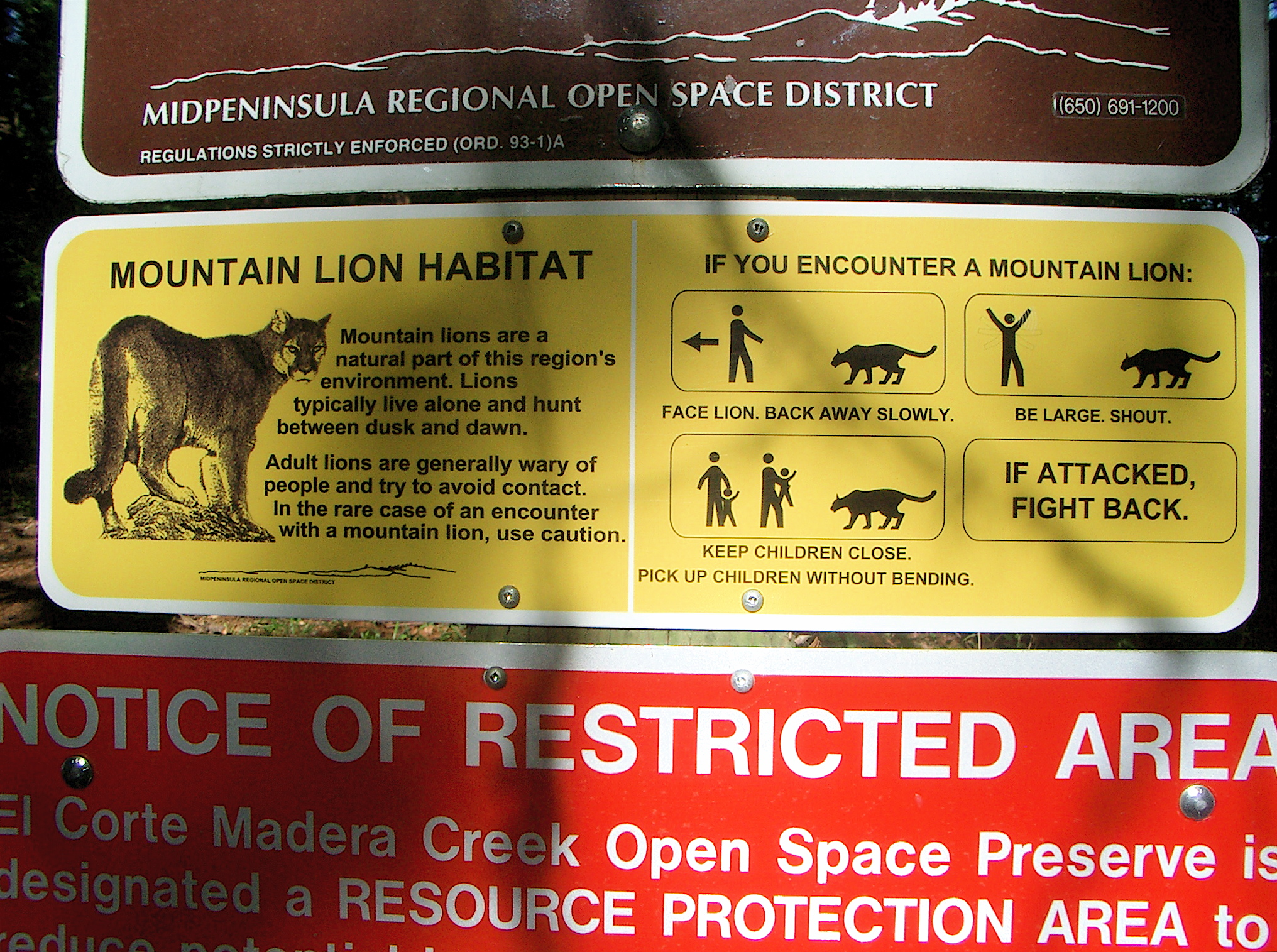
Mountain lion warning sign in California, U.S.

Due to the human population growth, cougar ranges increasingly overlap with areas inhabited by humans. Attacks on humans are very rare, as cougar prey recognition is a learned behavior, and it does not generally recognize humans as prey. In a 10-year study in New Mexico of wild cougars who were not habituated to humans, they did not exhibit threatening behavior to researchers who approached closely with a median distance of 18.5 m (61 ft) except in 6% of cases; 14/16 of those were females with cubs. Attacks on people, livestock, and pets occur when a cougar habituates to humans or is in a condition of severe starvation. Attacks are most frequent during late spring and summer when juvenile cougars leave their mothers and search for new territory.

Between 1890 and 1990 in North America, there were 53 reported, confirmed attacks on humans, resulting in 48 nonfatal injuries and 10 deaths of humans (the total is greater than 53 because some attacks had more than one victim). By 2004, the count had climbed to 88 attacks and 20 deaths.

Within North America, the distribution of attacks is not uniform. The heavily populated state of California saw a dozen attacks from 1986 to 2004 (after just three from 1890 to 1985), including three fatalities. In March 2024, two brothers in California were attacked by a male cougar, with one being fatally wounded; it was the state's first fatal attack in 20 years. Washington state was the site of a fatal attack in 2018, its first since 1924. Lightly populated New Mexico reported an attack in 2008, the first there since 1974.

As with many predators, a cougar may attack if cornered, if a fleeing human stimulates their instinct to chase, or if a person "plays dead". Standing still may cause the cougar to consider a person easy prey. Exaggerating the threat to the animal through intense eye contact, loud shouting, and any other action to appear larger and more menacing, may make the animal retreat. Fighting back with sticks and rocks, or even bare hands, is often effective in persuading an attacking cougar to disengage.

When cougars do attack, they usually employ their characteristic neck bite, attempting to position their teeth between the vertebrae and into the spinal cord. Neck, head, and spinal injuries are common and sometimes fatal. Children are at greatest risk of attack and least likely to survive an encounter. Detailed research into attacks before 1991 showed that 64% of all victims – and almost all fatalities – were children. The same study showed the highest proportion of attacks to have occurred in British Columbia, particularly on Vancouver Island, where cougar populations are especially dense. Preceding attacks on humans, cougars display aberrant behavior, such as activity during daylight hours, a lack of fear of humans, and stalking humans. There have sometimes been incidents of pet cougars mauling people.

Research on new wildlife collars may reduce human-animal conflicts by predicting when and where predatory animals hunt. This may save the lives of humans, pets, and livestock, as well as the lives of these large predatory mammals that are important to the balance of ecosystems.

==== In South America ====
Cougars in the Southern Cone of South America are reputed to be extremely reluctant to attack people; in legend, they defended people against jaguars. In the 19th century, Félix de Azara and William Henry Hudson thought that attacks on people, even children or sleeping adults, did not happen. Hudson, citing anecdots from hunters, claimed that cougars were positively inhibited from attacking people, even in self-defense. However, a few attacks on humans have occurred.

An early, authenticated, non-fatal case occurred near Lake Viedma in 1877 when a female mauled the Argentine scientist Francisco P. Moreno; Moreno afterward showed the scars to Theodore Roosevelt. In this instance, however, Moreno had been wearing a guanaco-hide poncho round his neck and head as protection against the cold; in Patagonia the guanaco is the puma's chief prey species. Another authenticated case occurred in 1997 in Iguazú National Park in northeastern Argentina, when the 20-month-old son of a ranger was killed by a female puma. Forensic analysis found specimens of the child's hair and clothing fibers in the animal's stomach. The coatí is the puma's chief prey in this area. Despite prohibitory signs, coatis are hand-fed by tourists in the park, causing unnatural approximation between cougars and humans. This particular puma had been raised in captivity and released into the wild.

On March 13, 2012, Erica Cruz, a 23-year-old shepherdess was found dead in a mountainous area near Rosario de Lerma, Salta Province, in northwestern Argentina. Claw incisions, which severed a jugular vein, indicated that the attacker was a felid; differential diagnosis ruled out other possible perpetrators. There were no bite marks on the victim, who had been herding goats. In 2019 in Córdoba Province, Argentina, an elderly man was badly injured by a cougar after he attempted to defend his dog from it, while in neighboring Chile a 28-year-old woman was attacked and killed in Corral, in Los Ríos Region, on October 20, 2020.

Fatal attacks by other carnivores, such as feral dogs, can be misattributed to cougars without appropriate forensic knowledge.

=== Predation on domestic animals ===
The Cougar Hunt, a 1920s silent film created by the United States Department of Agriculture which explains the procedures to successfully hunt livestock-threatening cougars

During the early years of ranching, cougars were considered on par with wolves in destructiveness. According to figures in Texas in 1990, 86 calves (0.0006% of Texas's 13.4 million cattle and calves), 253 mohair goats, 302 mohair kids, 445 sheep (0.02% of Texas's 2 million sheep and lambs) and 562 lambs (0.04% of Texas's 1.2 million lambs) were confirmed to have been killed by cougars that year.

Some instances of surplus killing have resulted in the deaths of 20 sheep in one attack. A cougar's killing bite is applied to the back of the neck, head, or throat and the cat inflicts puncture marks with its claws usually seen on the sides and underside of the prey, sometimes also shredding the prey as it holds on. Coyotes also typically bite the throat, but the work of a cougar is generally clean, while bites inflicted by coyotes and dogs leave ragged edges. The size of the tooth puncture marks also helps distinguish kills made by cougars from those made by smaller predators.

Remedial hunting appears to have the paradoxical effect of increased livestock predation and complaints of human-cougar conflicts. In a 2013 study, the most important predictor of cougar problems was the remedial hunting of cougars the previous year. Each additional cougar on the landscape increased predation and human-cougar complaints by 5%, but each animal killed during the previous year increased complaints by 50%. The effect had a dose-response relationship with very heavy (100% removal of adult cougars) remedial hunting, leading to a 150–340% increase in livestock and human conflicts. This effect is attributed to the removal of older cougars that have learned to avoid people and their replacement by younger males that react differently to humans. Remedial hunting enables younger males to enter the former territories of the older animals. Predation by cougars on dogs "is widespread, but occurs at low frequencies".

=== In mythology ===
The grace and power of the cougar have been widely admired in the cultures of the indigenous peoples of the Americas. The Inca city of Cusco is reported to have been designed in the shape of a cougar, and the animal also gave its name to both Inca regions and people. The Moche people often represented the cougar in their ceramics. The sky and thunder god of the Inca, Viracocha, has been associated with the animal.

In North America, mythological descriptions of the cougar have appeared in the stories of the Hoocąk ("Ho-Chunk" or "Winnebago") of Wisconsin and Illinois and the Cheyenne, among others. To the Apache and Walapai of the Southwestern United States, the wail of the cougar was a harbinger of death. The Algonquins and Ojibwe believe that the cougar lived in the underworld and was wicked, whereas it was a sacred animal among the Cherokee.

== See also ==
- List of largest cats
- Mountain lions in the Santa Monica Mountains
- Pumapard
