= Arturo Gómez-Pompa =

Mexican biologist (1934–2025)

Dr. Arturo Gómez-Pompa
- Born: October 21, 1934; Mexico City, Mexico
- Died: September 17, 2025 (aged 90)
- Education: National Autonomous University of Mexico
- Scientific career
- Fields: Botany
- Workplaces: University of California, Riverside; Botanical Research Institute of Texas; American Institute of Biological Sciences; United States House Committee on Science, Space, and Technology

Arturo Gómez-Pompa (October 21, 1934 – September 17, 2025) was a Mexican tropical biologist, a scientific advisor for the Tropical Research Center of the Universidad Veracruzana (CITRO), and a professor emeritus of botany at the University of California, Riverside. He made various contributions to the field of tropical ecology through the creation of databases used in botanical research, and he contributed to the research on the domestication of tropical trees.

Gómez-Pompa received numerous awards and recognition, including medals and elected positions in various academies. He continued to contribute to biology as an advisor and retired professor, and divided his time between Irving, Texas and Xalapa, Veracruz. He was from Mexico City.

== Background ==
Gómez-Pompa was born in 1934. He initially pursued a career in medicine to become a doctor, as his parents had hoped. However, this changed when he was fourteen and spent about two weeks exploring his cousin's ranch and falling in love with nature. Seeing wildlife such as coyotes, rattlesnakes, hawks, and cougars completely changed him, and he decided to study biology instead. Gómez-Pompa eventually obtained his Doctorate in Sciences (Biology) from the National Autonomous University of Mexico (UNAM) in 1966.

Gómez-Pompa died on September 17, 2025, at the age of 90.

== Career ==
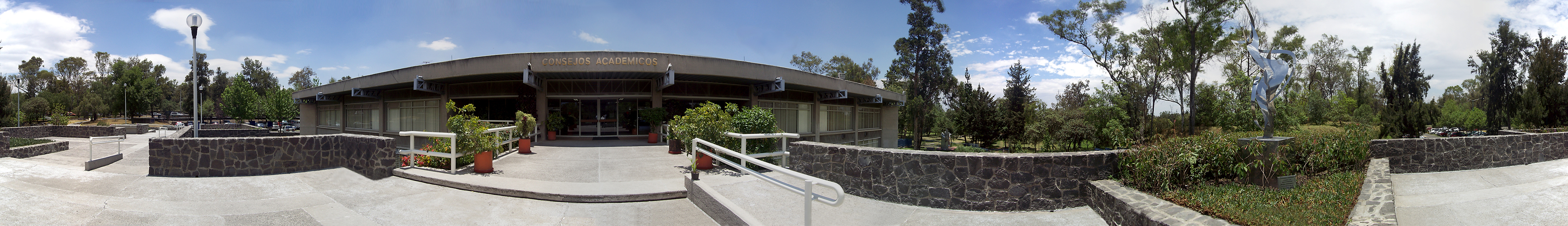
National Autonomous University of Mexico where Gómez-Pompa obtained his doctorate in Sciences (Biology) in 1966.

Gómez-Pompa was a tropical biologist who had spent over 40 years in academia in various international institutions as a professor, helping to teach generations of future leaders in science.

Gómez-Pompa's projects included these topics - ethnobotanical studies, evolution and domestication of tropical trees, biodiversity restoration of tropical forests, agroforestry, and community-based conservation policies for the tropics.

=== Honorary positions ===
Gómez-Pompa was a member of the Governing Board of the Universidad Veracruzana, a member of the board of directors in the Botanical Research Institute of Texas, and the American Institute of Biological Sciences. He was also President of the Board of Directors of El Eden Ecological Reserve, and an AC member of the executive board of the Tyler Prize. Gómez-Pompa was also a member of the Advisory Committee of the Committee on Science, Space and Technology of the House of Representatives of the United States; a member of the Board of the Smithsonian Institution of Washington; the founder and member of the Board of Directors of Pro-Natura in Veracruz.

Some more academic-based positions he had occupied include Director of the Institute of the University of California for Mexico and the United States, and founder of the Research Institute on Biotic Resources. He was also head of the Department of Botany and Professor of Ecology and Botany in the Faculty of Sciences of the National University in the Institute of Biology at UNAM.

== Research contributions and accomplishments ==
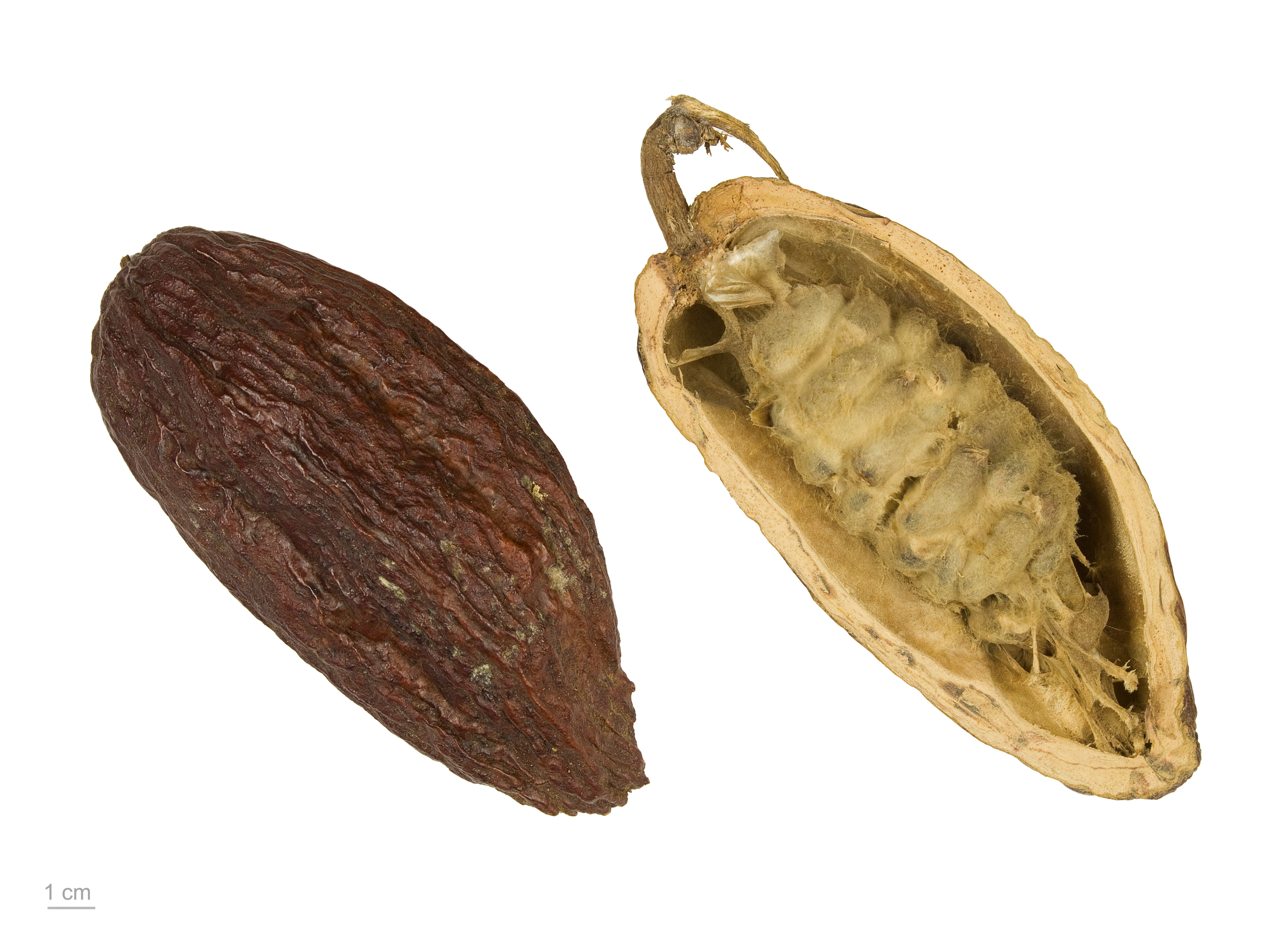
Theobroma cacao, or tree of chocolate- Gómez-Pompa discovered the use of this tree as an ancient crop in rejolladas and cenotes within the Yucatán Peninsula.

He discovered the use of Theobroma cacao, or the tree of chocolate, as ancient crops in rejolladas and cenotes within the Yucatán Peninsula. This confirmed his hypothesis on the anthropogenic origins of the Mayan forests and advanced future research in the domestication of tropical trees. Gómez-Pompa created a database for the Flora of Veracruz project in the 1960s that is still utilized to this day as a continuous source for many botanical institutions.

=== Awards ===
Gómez-Pompa received the Gold Medal of Merit from Veracruz University, the David Fairchild Medal of the National Garden of the United States, the Chevron Award, the Tyler Prize for Environmental Achievement, the Luis Elizondo Prize in Science and Technology from the Technological Institute and Superior Studies of Monterrey, the Medal "Ark of Gold" ("Golden Arch") of the Government of the Netherlands, the "Alfonso L. Herrera" Medal of the Mexican Institute of Renewable Natural Resources, the Medal of "Botanical Merit" from the Botanical Society of Mexico, the Medal of Ecological Merit, and the Scholar of the Guggenheim Foundation.

=== Memberships ===
Gómez-Pompa was also a member of various organizations and institutions such as the American Academy of Arts and Sciences of the United States, the Mexican Academy of Sciences, Third World Academy of Sciences, and the Academy of Sciences of Latin America. He was also an elected member of the Biology Committee of the Council of Scientific Research of the United States, and by the Governing Board of the University of California as the twenty-ninth University Professor which is the highest academic honor granted by the university to its professors.

== Publications ==
In this animation, a root tuber is being colonized by an arbuscular mycorrhizal fungus (AMF). Arturo and his colleagues studied the allelopathic roles played by these same fungi in terms of ecological disturbance.

Gómez-Pompa, A., M. F. Allen and S, Fedick. 2003. Future Challenges in Research: Summary of Recommendations for Research. In: Gómez-Pompa, A. et al. (eds.). The Lowland Maya Area: three millennia at the human-wildland interface. The Haworth Press. New York.

- In this book, Gómez-Pompa and his colleagues use history, biodiversity, ethnobotany, geology, ecology, archaeology, anthropology, and other fields of study to create a guide for the Lowland Mayan Area that highlights the unique relationship between man and nature in the Yucatán peninsula.

Allen, E. B., M. F. Allen, L. Egerton-Warburton, L. Corkidi, A. Gomez-Pompa, Arturo. Impacts of early- and late-seral mycorrhizae during restoration in seasonal tropical forest, Mexico. Ecological Applications. 13(6): 1701–1717.

- Gómez-Pompa and his colleagues looked at how disturbance may change the species composition of arbuscular mycorrhizal fungi (AMF) and the plant species that are affected by them. Their results suggested that when seedlings are infused, early-seral AMF should be used for restoration.

Anaya, A. L., R. Mata, J. Sims, A. Gonzalez-Coloma, R. Cruz-Ortega, A. Guadano, B. E. Hernandez-Bautista, S. L. Midland, G. Rios, A. Gomez-Pompa, Allelochemical potential of Callicarpa acuminata. Journal of Chemical Ecology 29(12): 2761–2776.

- In this paper, Gómez-Pompa and various other scientists discuss the allelopathic roles that metabolites of M. yucatanesis play and the ecological interactions it has with its host plant and other organisms.

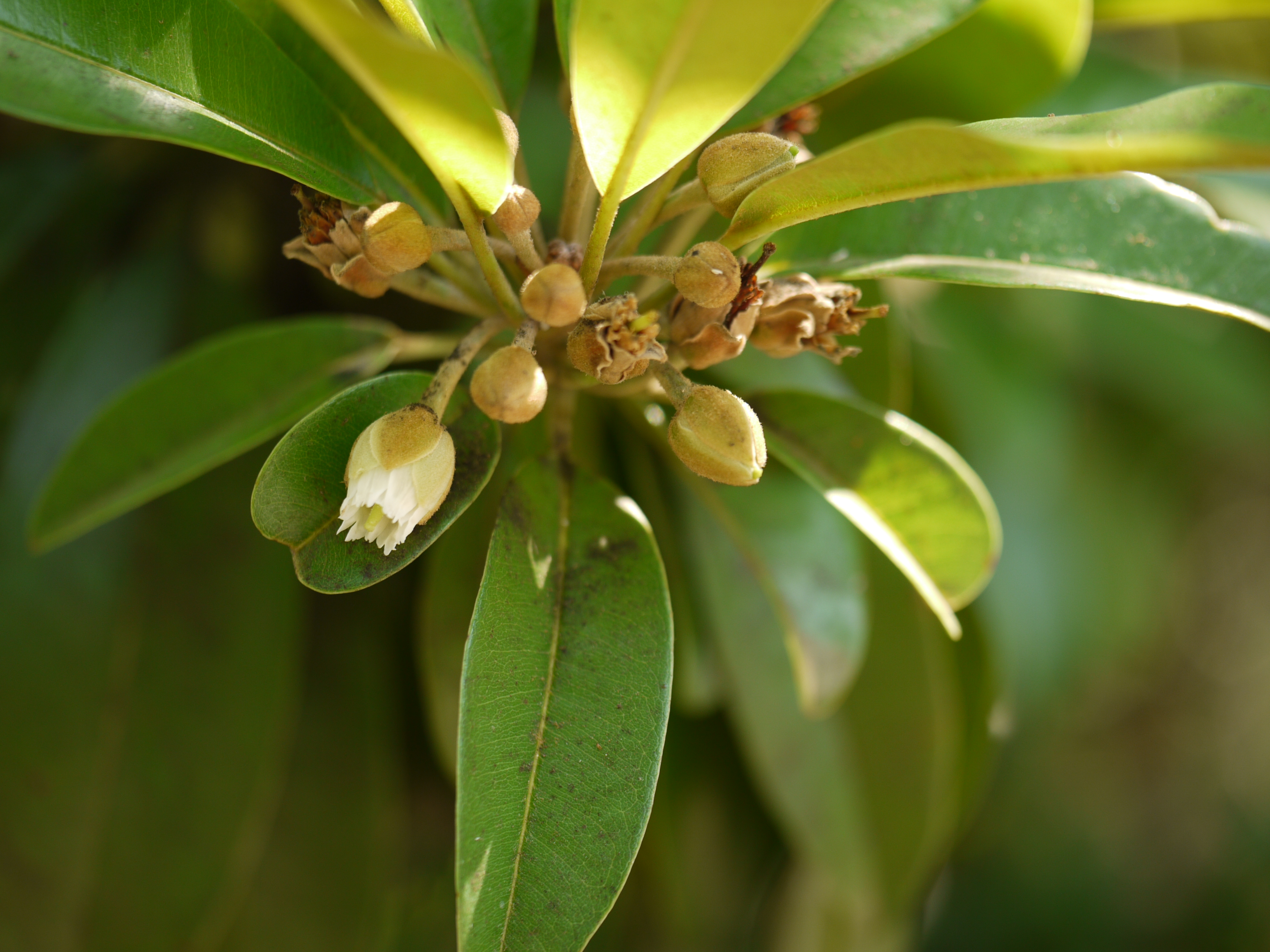
The chicozapote (Manilkara zapota) is a tropical tree that grows in both forest and swamp environments. Arturo and his colleges ran a RAPD analysis on the two morphologically distinct populations to see what components contributed to their genetic variation.

Gomez-Pompa, A. and A. Kaus. 1999. From prehispanic to future conservation alternatives: lessons from Mexico. Proceedings of the National Academy of Sciences 96: 5982–5986.

- In this paper, Gómez-Pompa and Andrea review past and current trends in biodiversity conservation in Mexico and search for possible reasons on how ecosystems manage to cope from a long history of depredation and inefficient conservation policies.

Heaton, H. J., R. Whitkus, and A. Gomez-Pompa. 1999. Extreme ecological and phenotypic differences in the tropical tree chicozapote (Manilkara zapota (L.) van Royen) are not matched by genetic divergence: A RAPD analysis. Molec. Ecol. 8: 627–632.

- In this paper, Gómez-Pompa and his colleagues perform a RAPD analysis on four different populations of two morphologically distinct populations of chicozapote (Manilkara zapota) to test for any genetic components that contributed to its variation between their forest and swamp habitats.

Gomez-Pompa, A. 1999. La conservacion de la biodiversidad en Mexico: mitos y realidades: mitos y realidades. Bol. Soc. Bot. Mexico. 63: 33–41.

- Gómez-Pompa writes a reflection on the problems of conservation in Mexico and what changes need to be done to better the system.

Whikus, R., M. de la Cruz, L. Mota-Bravo, A. Gomez-Pompa. 1998. Genetic diversity and relationships of wild cacao (Theobroma cacao L.) in southern Mexico. Theoret. And Appl. Genet. 96: 621–627.

- In this paper, by running a RAPD analysis, Gómez-Pompa and his colleagues found that the Maya possibly maintained plants out of their native habitats as it correlates with their early agroforestry practices. They suggest modern attempts to increase cacao germplasms should refer to ancient cultivation sites to look at their earlier genetic diversity.
