= Bacillus thuringiensis israelensis =

Scientific classification
- Domain: Bacteria
- Kingdom: Bacillati
- Phylum: Bacillota
- Class: Bacilli
- Order: Caryophanales
- Family: Bacillaceae
- Genus: Bacillus
- Species: B. thuringiensis
- Subspecies: B. t. subsp. israelensis

Trinomial name
- Bacillus thuringiensis subsp. israelensis Barjac, 1978

Subspecies of bacterium

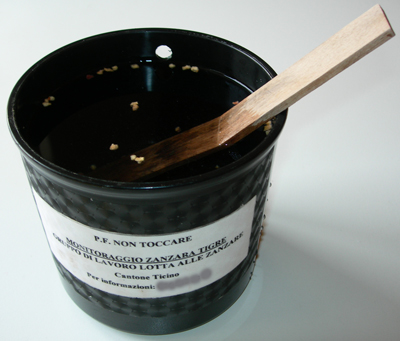
An Ovitrap, a tool for the collection of eggs from tiger mosquitoes: In this case, an ovitrap type used for the monitoring of the Asian tiger mosquito Aedes albopictus in the Swiss canton of Ticino. The presence of the mosquitoes is detected through the eggs they lay on the wooden paddle or from larvae that hatch from these eggs in the laboratory. The brown granules in the water are a Bacillus thuringiensis israelensis preparation that will kill mosquito larvae that hatch in the ovitrap. Ovitraps are also used to monitor the Culex mosquito, yellow fever mosquito Aedes aegypti.

Bacillus thuringiensis serovar israelensis (Bti) is a group of bacteria used as biological control agents for larvae stages of certain dipterans. Bti, along with other B. thuringiensis products, produces toxins lethal to various species of mosquitoes, fungus gnats, and blackflies but which have negligible effects on other organisms. The major advantage of B. thuringiensis products is that they are thought to affect few non-target species. However, even though Bti may have minimal direct effects on non-target organisms, it carries the potential for knock-on effects on food webs and other ecosystem properties, including biodiversity and ecosystem functioning.

Bti strains possess the pBtoxis plasmid which encodes numerous Cry (a δ-endotoxin) and Cyt toxins, including Cry4, Cry10, Cry11, Cyt1, and Cyt2. The crystal aggregation which these toxins form contains at least four major toxic components, but the extent to which each Cry and Cyt protein is represented is not known and likely to vary with strain and formulation. Both Cry and Cyt proteins are pore-forming toxins; they lyse midgut epithelial cells by inserting into the target cell membrane and forming pores.

Commercial formulations include "Mosquito Dunks", "Mosquito Bits", and "VectoBac". It is also available in bulk liquid or granular formulations for commercial and public agency use.

== Discovery ==
Bacillus thuringiensis israelensis (Bti) was discovered in 1976 by Yoel Margalith, a professor at Ben Gurion University in Israel.

The initial field tests of Bti were conducted in 1978 against the floodwater mosquito species Aedes vexans in the River Rhine Valley of Germany. This early experimentation demonstrated the efficacy of Bti in controlling mosquito populations, leading to its widespread adoption. Over the years, Bti has been extensively used by various organizations, including the German Mosquito Control Association, Kommunale Aktionsgemeinschaft zur Bekämpfung der Schnakenplage e.V. (KABS), which has utilized Bti for almost four decades without encountering resistance issues.

Today, Bti is utilized globally across all continents to manage mosquito populations, although controlling certain vector species like Aedes aegypti and Aedes albopictus remains challenging due to their breeding habits in small and hidden containers.

== Long name ==
Bacillus thuringiensis subspecies israelensis strain EG2215

== See also ==
- Malaria
