= Yoel Margalith =

Israeli academic

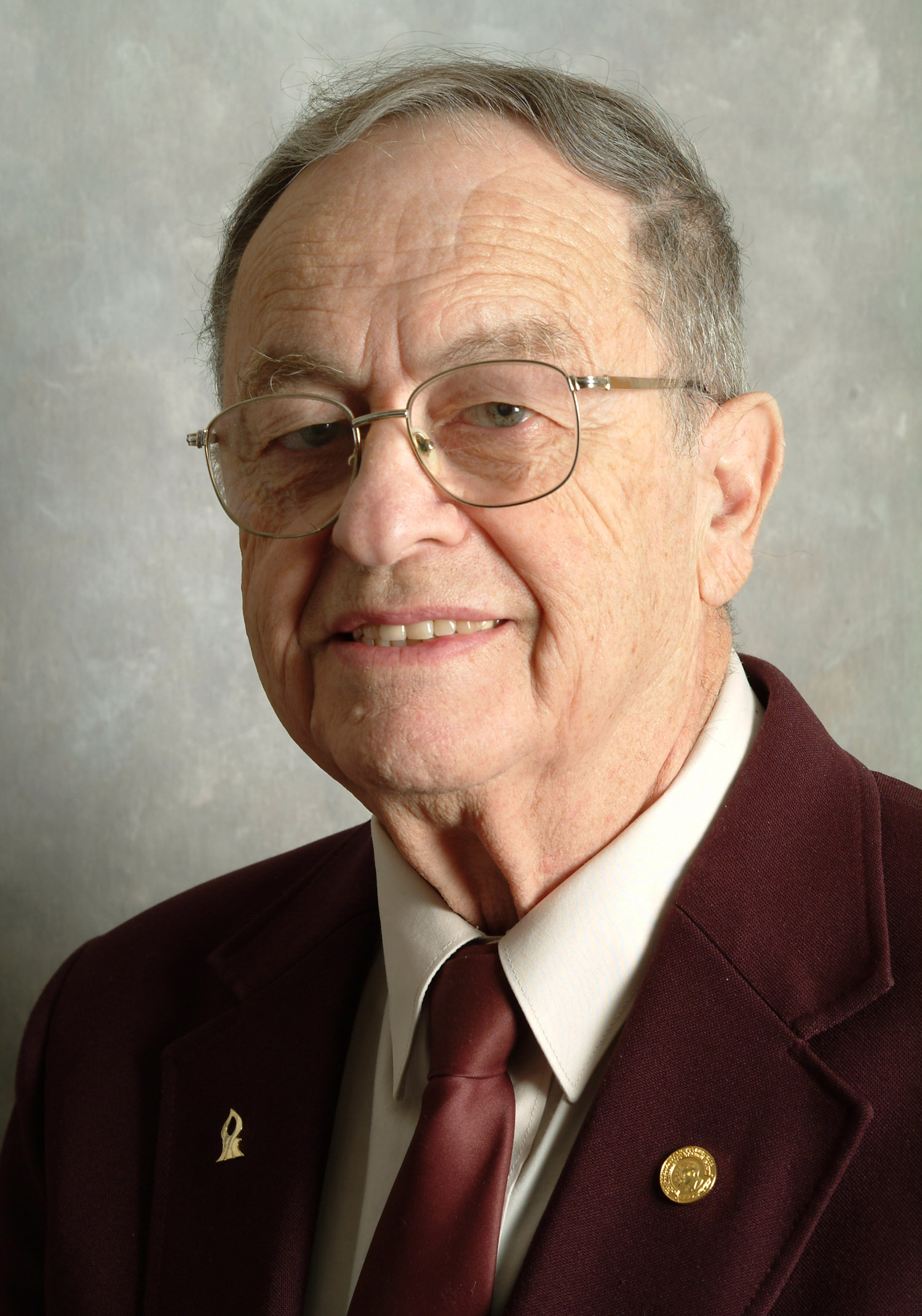
Margalith (2003)

Yoel Margalith (Hebrew: יואל מרגלית; February 1933 – 2011) was an Israeli researcher. He was a professor at the Ben-Gurion University of the Negev.

== Biography ==
Yoel Margalith was born in February 1933 in Čantavir, Yugoslavia. Yoel survived the Bergen-Belsen concentration camp during the holocaust. In 1948, he emigrated to Israel with his family. Margalith attended the Hebrew University of Jerusalem.

Margalith discovered Bacillus thuringiensis israelensis and was given the name, Mr. Mosquito, due to this discovery.

== Awards ==
- 2003: Tyler Prize for Environmental Achievement
