= Tyler Prize for Environmental Achievement =

- Awarded for: Environmental Achievement
- Country: United States
- Presented by: University of Southern California
- Reward: $250,000
- Website: tylerprize.org

The Tyler Prize for Environmental Achievement is an annual award for environmental science, environmental health, and energy. Tyler Laureates receive a $250,000 cash prize and a medallion. The prize is administered by the University of Southern California and was established by John and Alice Tyler in 1973. It is regarded as the "Nobel for environment".

== History ==
Tyler Prize for Environmental Achievement was founded in 1973 by John and Alice Tyler and was launched by Ronald Reagan while serving as Governor of California. It was funded with a gift of $5 million by Jack Tyler and was initially administered by Pepperdine University.

== Laureates ==
- 2026: Toby Kiers
- 2025: Sandra Díaz and Eduardo Brondízio
- 2024: Johan Rockström
- 2023: Daniel Pauly and Ussif Rashid Sumaila
- 2022: Sir Andrew Haines
- 2020: Gretchen Daily and Pavan Sukhdev
- 2019: Michael E. Mann and Warren M. Washington
- 2018: Paul Falkowski and James J. McCarthy
- 2017: José Sarukhán Kermez
- 2016: Sir Partha S. Dasgupta
- 2015: Madhav Gadgil and Jane Lubchenco
- 2014: Simon A. Levin
- 2013: Diana Wall
- 2012: John H. Seinfeld and Kirk R. Smith
- 2011: May R. Berenbaum
- 2010: Laurie Marker and Stuart Pimm
- 2009: Richard B. Alley and Veerabhadran Ramanathan
- 2008: James N. Galloway and Harold Mooney
- 2007: Gatze Lettinga
- 2006: David W. Schindler and Igor A. Shiklomanov
- 2005: Charles D. Keeling and Lonnie G. Thompson
- 2004: Barefoot College and Red Latinoamericana de Botanica
- 2003: Hans Herren, Yoel Margalith and Sir Richard Doll who established the link between lung cancer and cigarette smoking.
- 2002: Wallace S. Broecker and Tungsheng Liu
- 2001: Jared M. Diamond and Thomas E. Lovejoy
- 2000: John P. Holdren
- 1999: Te-Tzu Chang and Joel E. Cohen
- 1998: Anne H. Ehrlich and Paul R. Ehrlich
- 1997: Jane Goodall, Biruté Galdikas and George Schaller
- 1996: Willi Dansgaard, Hans Oeschger and Claude Lorius
- 1995: Clair C. Patterson
- 1994: Arturo Gomez-Pompa and Peter H. Raven
- 1993: F. Herbert Bormann and Gene E. Likens
- 1992: Perry McCarty and Robert M. White
- 1991: C. Everett Koop and M. S. Swaminathan
- 1990: Thomas Eisner and Jerrold Meinwald
- 1989: Paul J. Crutzen and Edward D. Goldberg
- 1988: Bert R. J. Bolin
- 1987: Richard E. Schultes and Gilbert F. White
- 1986: Werner Stumm and Richard Vollenweider
- 1985: Bruce N. Ames and the Organization for Tropical Studies
- 1984: Roger R. Revelle and Edward O. Wilson
- 1983: Harold S. Johnston, Mario J. Molina and F. Sherwood Rowland
- 1982: Carroll L. Wilson and the Southern California Edison Company
- 1978: Russell E. Train
- 1977: Eugene P. Odum
- 1976: Abel Wolman, Charles S. Elton and Rene Dubos
- 1975: Ruth Patrick
- 1974: Arie Jan Haagen-Smit, G. Evelyn Hutchinson and Maurice Strong

== Executive committee ==
The Executive Committee oversees the activities of the Tyler Prize, including the selection of Tyler Prize Laureates. Members of this international Committee are selected for their experience in the fields of relevance to the Tyler Prize and are assisted by the Tyler Prize Administrator, based at the University of Southern California. The current committee consists of:

- Julia Marton-Lefèvre
- Rosina M. Bierbaum
- Julia Carabias Lillo
- Margaret Catley-Carlson
- Alan Covich
- Exequiel Ezcurra
- Kelly Sims Gallagher
- Judith E. McDowell
- Kenneth Nealson
- Jonathan Patz
- Jim Watson

== See also ==
- Environmental Media Awards
- Global 500 Roll of Honour
- Global Environmental Citizen Award
- Goldman Environmental Prize
- Grantham Prize for Excellence in Reporting on the Environment
- Heroes of the Environment
- List of environmental awards
