= Paul Falkowski =

American biological oceanographer

Paul G. Falkowski
- Born: 1951 (age 74–75)
- Education: City College of New York; University of British Columbia
- Awards: Huntsman Medal; Hutchison Prize; Vernadsky medal (EGU); ECI Prize; Tyler Prize
- Scientific career
- Fields: Biological oceanographer
- Workplaces: University of Rhode Island; Brookhaven National Laboratory; Rutgers University
- Doctoral students: Felisa Lauren Wolfe-Simon

Paul G. Falkowski (born 1951) is an American biological oceanographer in the Institute of Marine and Coastal Sciences at Rutgers University in New Brunswick, New Jersey. His research work focuses on phytoplankton and primary production, and his wider interests include evolution, paleoecology, photosynthesis, biogeochemical cycles and astrobiology.

== Early life and education ==
Born in New York City in 1951, Falkowski was educated at the City College of New York, where he received his BSc. and MSc. degrees. He completed his doctoral thesis in biology and biophysics at the University of British Columbia in 1975.

== Career ==
After postdoctoral research at the University of Rhode Island, he moved to the Brookhaven National Laboratory in 1976 to join its newly formed oceanography department, and in 1998 he moved to Rutgers University. He received a Guggenheim Fellowship in 1992, and was appointed as Cecil and Ida Green Distinguished Professor at the University of British Columbia in 1996.

Falkowski's research work has included studies of phytoplankton nutrient acquisition and the relationships with light of both phytoplankton and corals. He has also studied the biophysical controls on ocean productivity and export production, and the importance of the nitrogen and iron cycles in ocean biogeochemistry. His research has also drawn in geoengineering, astrobiology, and the evolution of groups including phytoplankton and placental mammals. He is also a co-author, with John Raven, of the influential textbook Aquatic Photosynthesis.

== Awards and honours ==
He has been elected to a number of learned societies including the American Geophysical Union (2001), the American Academy of Arts and Sciences (2002) and the National Academy of Sciences (2007). He has also received a number of awards including the A.G. Huntsman Award for Excellence in the Marine Sciences (1998), the G. Evelyn Hutchinson Award (2000), the European Geosciences Union Vernadsky Medal (2005) and the ECI Prize (2010). In 2018, Paul Falkowski was nominated as a recipient of the Tyler Prize for Environmental Achievement for his work on phytoplankton as it relates to climate change impacts. He shares the 2018 Tyler Prize, known as the "Nobel Prize" of the environment, with fellow biological oceanographer Dr. James J. McCarthy of Harvard University.
