= Robinsonella samaricarpa =

Conservation status
- Endangered (IUCN 3.1)

Scientific classification
- Kingdom: Plantae
- Clade: Tracheophytes
- Clade: Angiosperms
- Clade: Eudicots
- Clade: Rosids
- Order: Malvales
- Family: Malvaceae
- Genus: Robinsonella
- Species: R. samaricarpa

Binomial name
- Robinsonella samaricarpa Fryxell

Species of flowering plant

Robinsonella samaricarpa is a species of flowering plant in the family Malvaceae. It is found only in Mexico.
