= James McCarthy (oceanographer) =

American oceanographer (1944–2019)

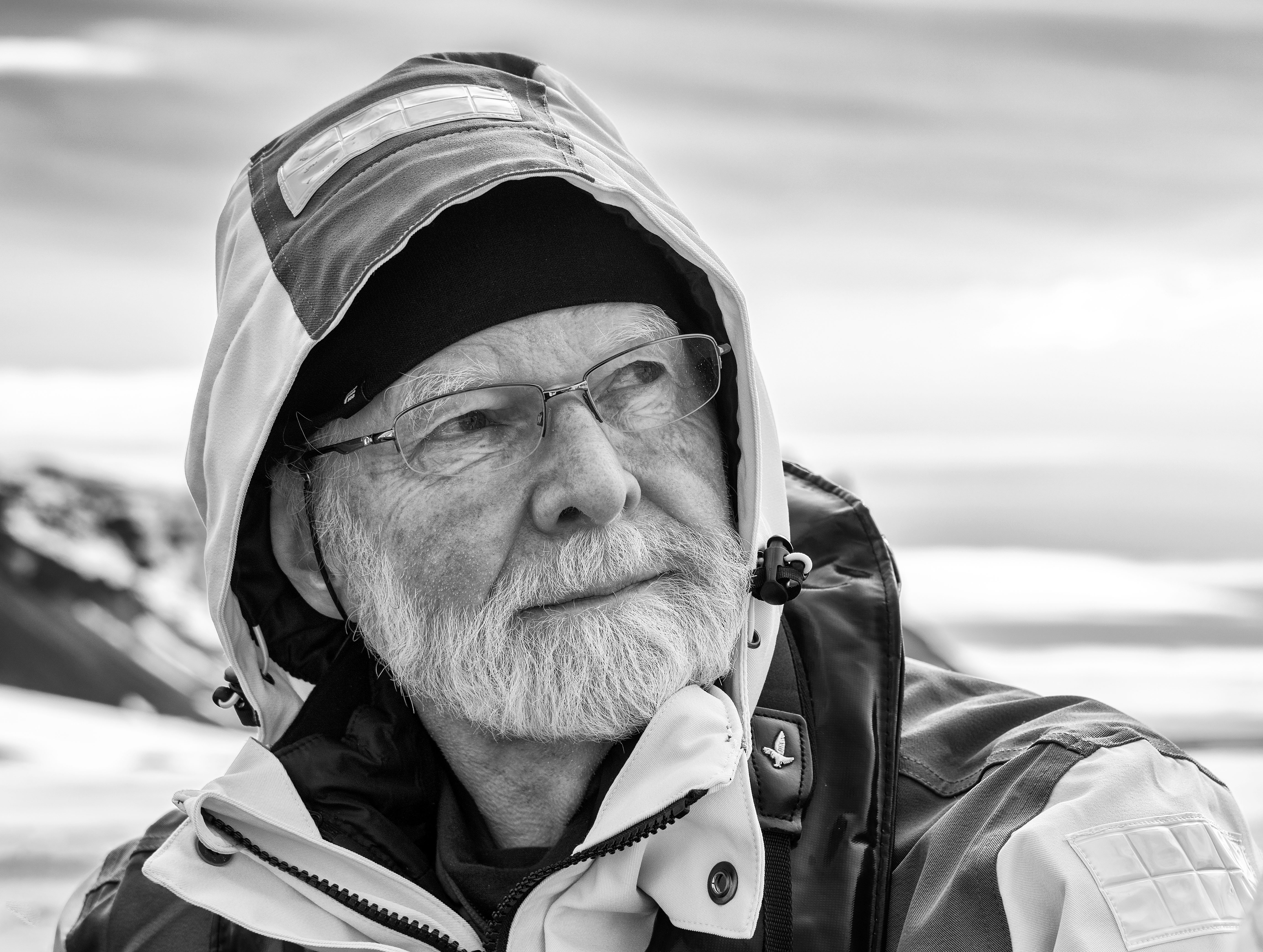
Professor James McCarthy en route to the North Pole

James J. McCarthy (January 25, 1944 – December 11, 2019) was a Professor of Biological Oceanography at Harvard and was president of the American Association for the Advancement of Science from February 2008 to February 2009.

McCarthy was the Alexander Agassiz Professor of Biological Oceanography in the Department of Organismic and Evolutionary Biology and former Master of Pforzheimer House. He was also Acting Curator of the Malacology Department in the Museum of Comparative Zoology.

His studies addressed factors that regulate the processes of primary production and nutrient supply in upper ocean, approached using controlled laboratory studies and field investigations. Study sites ranged from near shore to the open ocean. Later field research sites included the North Atlantic, equatorial Pacific, and Arabian Sea.

He was on the faculty of the Harvard Medical School Center for Health and the Global Environment.

== Biography ==
McCarthy grew up in Sweet Home, Oregon and graduated from Sweet Home High School in 1962.

McCarthy received his undergraduate degree in biology from Gonzaga University, and his Ph.D. from Scripps Institution of Oceanography in 1971. His research interests related to the regulation of plankton productivity in the sea, and in later years focused on regions that are strongly affected by seasonal and inter-annual variation in climate.

From 1979 until 2002 McCarthy was the Director of Harvard University's Museum of Comparative Zoology. He held faculty appointments in the Department of Organismic and Evolutionary Biology and the Department of Earth and Planetary Sciences, and he was the Head Tutor for degrees in Environmental Science and Public Policy.

From 1986 to 1993, he chaired the international committee that establishes research priorities and oversees implementation of the International Geosphere-Biosphere Programme. He was the founding editor for the American Geophysical Union's journal Global Biogeochemical Cycles. He was involved in two of the recent international assessments on climate impacts. He served as co-chair of the IPCC, Working Group II, which had responsibilities for assessing impacts of and vulnerabilities to global climate change for the Third IPCC Assessment (2001). He was also one of the lead authors on the recently completed Arctic Climate Impact Assessment.

McCarthy was also a Fellow of the American Academy of Arts and Sciences, and a Foreign Member of the Royal Swedish Academy of Sciences.

He was emeritus chair of the Board of Directors for the Union of Concerned Scientists.

== Awards and honors ==
- Distinguished Alumni Merit Award, Gonzaga University (1993)
- O’Leary Distinguished Scientist Lecture, Gonzaga University (2008)
- Walker Prize (2008)
- 2009 Scientist of the Year by the Harvard Foundation
- New England Aquarium’s David B. Stone Award

In 2018, James J. McCarthy was nominated as a recipient of the Tyler Prize for Environmental Achievement for his work on phytoplankton as it relates to climate change impacts and his outstanding leadership in the field of science policy. He shared the 2018 Tyler Prize, known as the "Nobel Prize" of the environment, with fellow biological oceanographer Paul Falkowski of Rutgers University.
