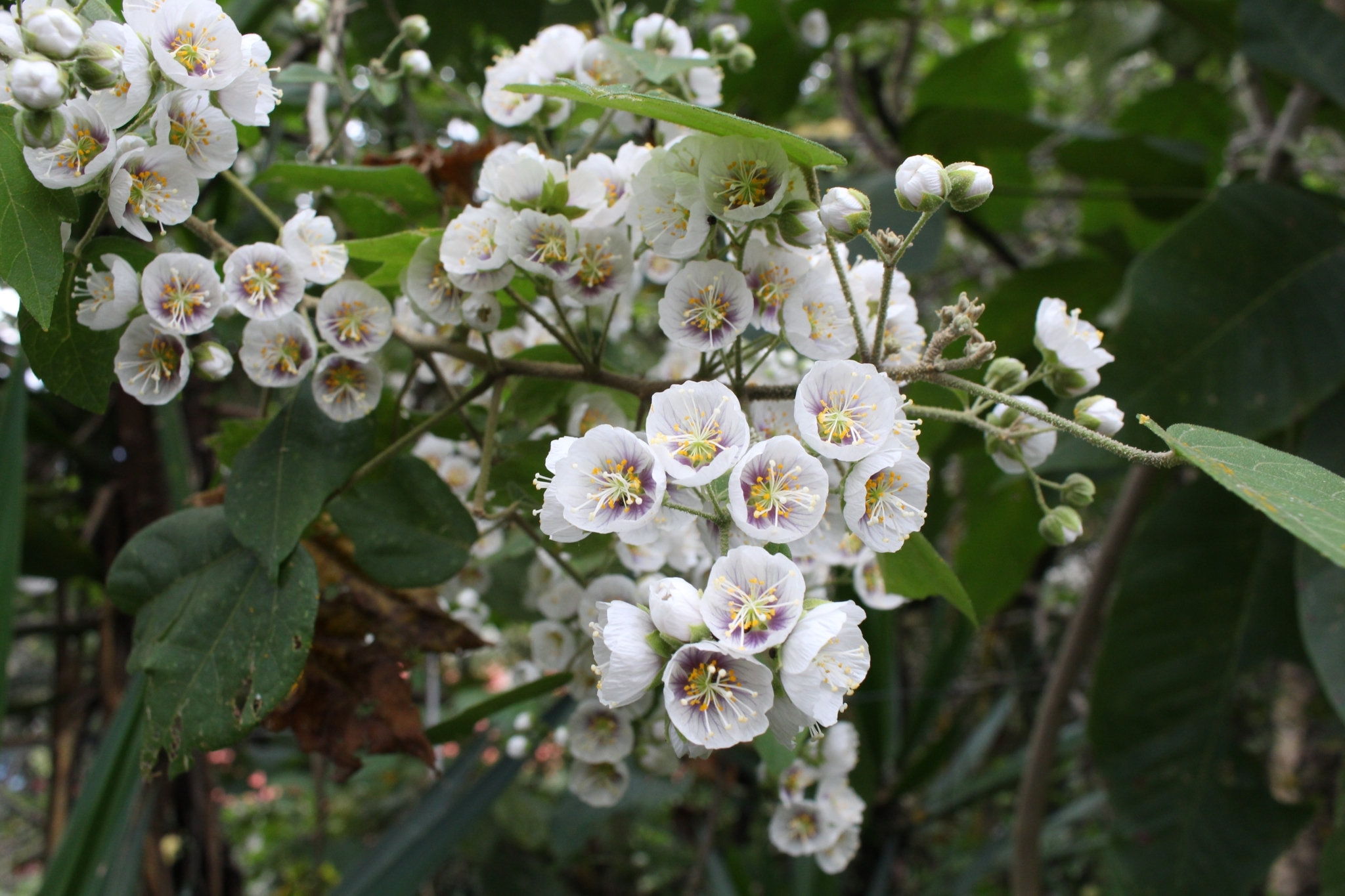
- Robinsonella lindeniana

Scientific classification
- Kingdom: Plantae
- Clade: Tracheophytes
- Clade: Angiosperms
- Clade: Eudicots
- Clade: Rosids
- Order: Malvales
- Family: Malvaceae
- Subfamily: Malvoideae
- Tribe: Malveae
- Genus: Robinsonella; Rose & Baker f.

Synonyms
- Rebsamenia Conz.

= Robinsonella =

Genus of flowering plants

Robinsonella is a genus of flowering plants in the family Malvaceae. It contains sixteen species of trees occurring from Costa Rica to southern Mexico, eight of which occur in the Mexican state of Chiapas.

== Species ==
As of 2022, the following species are recognised in the genus Robinsonella:

- Robinsonella brevituba Fryxell
- Robinsonella chiangii Fryxell
- Robinsonella cordata Rose & Baker f.
- Robinsonella densiflora Fryxell
- Robinsonella discolor Rose & Baker f.
- Robinsonella erasmi-sosae C.Nelson
- Robinsonella glabrifolia Fryxell
- Robinsonella hintonii Fryxell
- Robinsonella lindeniana (Turcz.) Rose & Baker f.
- Robinsonella macvaughii Fryxell
- Robinsonella mirandae Gómez Pompa
- Robinsonella pilosa Rose
- Robinsonella pilosissima Fryxell
- Robinsonella pleiopoda (Donn.Sm.) Fryxell
- Robinsonella samaricarpa Fryxell
- Robinsonella speciosa Fryxell

== In culture ==
Trees of Robinsonella speciosa are traditionally grown as ornamental plants in the gardens of the Tojolabal and Tzeltal city of Comitán de Domínguez in the highlands of southern Chiapas, where it is called tenocté; it has beautiful white flowers which appear in May before the leaves do. According to traditional knowledge, it is important for women never to touch the tree, especially when it is in flower, for it will cause them to immediately elope with their boyfriends, and even worse, with whichever man that passes their sight.
