= Kirk R. Smith =

American climatologist

Kirk Smith
- Born: January 19, 1947; Berkeley, California, U.S.
- Died: June 15, 2020 (aged 73); Berkeley, California, U.S.
- Education: University of California, Berkeley A.B., M.P.H., Ph.D.
- Known for: First cookstove RCT; Contributions to IPCC
- Awards: Tyler Prize (2012); Heinz Award (2009); Co-Author of Nobel-Winning Climate Report (2007)
- Scientific career
- Fields: Environmental Health; Global Health; Energy Policy
- Workplaces: University of California, Berkeley; Tsinghua University (honorary)
- Doctoral advisors: John Holdren, Robert C. Spear, West Churchman
- Website: www.kirkrsmith.org

Kirk R. Smith (January 19, 1947 – June 15, 2020) was an American expert on the health and climate effects of household energy use in developing nations. He held a professorship in Global Environmental Health at the University of California, Berkeley, where his research focused on the relationships among environmental quality, health, resource use, climate, development, and policy in developing countries. Smith contributed a great deal to the Intergovernmental Panel on Climate Change (IPCC), and the work of the IPCC (including the contributions of many scientists) was recognized by the joint award of the 2007 Nobel Peace Prize. Smith was a recipient of the 2012 Tyler Prize for Environmental Achievement for his work with cookstoves, health, and climate. He is also credited with designing and implementing the first randomized controlled trial of the health effects of indoor air pollution (IAP) from cookstoves.

== Early life ==
Smith was born in Berkeley, California, on January 19, 1947. His father, Robert Nisbet, worked as an attorney and served as the first general manager of AC Transit. His mother, Ruth Smith, worked at a Japanese internment camp during the Second World War and conducted research with Timothy Leary. His parents divorced when he was four, and he subsequently adopted his stepfather's surname. He grew up in the California East Bay, where he attended Piedmont public schools until age 11, when his family moved to San Anselmo and he graduated from Sir Francis Drake High School, and went on to attend the University of California, Berkeley. At Berkeley, he received his Bachelor of Arts (1968) in Physics and Astronomy, his Master of Public Health (1972) in Environmental Health Sciences, and his Doctorate (PhD) (1977) in Biomedical and Environmental Health with a focus on Energy & Environment.

== Career ==
Smith's studies at Berkeley led to developments in coal-ash recycling and nuclear risk assessment, and were conducted under the advisorship of the Science Advisor to U.S. President Barack Obama, John Holdren. Smith moved to Hawaii after completing his PhD; there he founded the Energy Program at the East-West Center. He was in charge of the center's work on energy research problems in the Asia-Pacific regions until 1985, when he became the coordinator for environmental risk research. After a decade as coordinator, he returned to UC Berkeley in 1995 and became a member of the faculty at the UC Berkeley School of Public Health. Smith was a professor of global environmental health, the founder and co-director of the university's Global Health and Environment Program, and associate director for international programs at the Center for Occupational and Environmental Health. His work followed his mantra: "You don't get what you expect, you get what you inspect."

== Death ==
Smith died on June 15, 2020, at his home in Berkeley. He was 73 and had suffered a stroke and resulting cardiac arrest.

== Selected honors and awards ==
- Tyler Prize for Environmental Achievement (2012)
- 14th Distinguished Lecture, Qatar Foundation, Doha (2012)
- The 15th Annual Heinz Award with special focus on the Environment (2009)
- Lifetime Achievement Award, Mrigendra-Samjhana Medical Trust, Nepal (2009)
- Senator Frank R. Lautenberg Award, Rutgers University (2009)
- UC Berkeley Chancellor's Award for Research in the Public Interest (2008)
- Co-Author of the IPCC report on Climate Change. IPCC won the 2007 Nobel Peace Prize.
- Honorary University Professor, Sichuan University, Chengdu, China (2004)
- Brian and Jennifer Maxwell Endowed Chair in Public Health (2003–2007)
- Wesolowski Award: International Society for Exposure Analysis/Science (1999)
- Elected Member, U.S. National Academy of Sciences (1997)
- Elected Member, International Academy of Indoor Air Sciences (1997)
- Elected by editors and scientific advisors of Science Digest as “One of America’s 100 Brightest Young Scientists” (1984)
