= El Eden Ecological Reserve =

- Location within Quintana Roo
- Location: Quintana Roo, Mexico
- Coordinates: 21°13′00″N 87°11′00″W
- Website: reservaeleden.org

El Eden Ecological Reserve is a non governmental organization Ecological Reserve in Quintana Roo, Mexico.

Located at the northeastern tip of the Yucatán Peninsula (30 miles (48 km) NW of Cancun), El Eden is a non-governmental natural protected area of the mesoamerican tropical rain forest. It is the home of a variety of research projects in Agroecology, Archaeology, Biodiversity Studies, Ecosystem Studies, Ecotourism, GIS, Regional Studies, Restoration Ecology, Silviculture, and Wildlife Management.

There are seven major ecosystems represented at El Eden including Semideciduous tropical rain forest, Secondary semideciduous forest, Seasonally inundated forest, Palm Grove, Savanna, Other wetlands, and Cenote.

One of the main research projects/groups that is hosted at El Eden is HabitatNet, which is a global biodiversity monitoring project. The field research is performed by secondary and high school students and teachers from all over the world that compare local plants and animals with each other, and with those in the students’ native habitats. The reports created from the students’ work is then submitted to the Smithsonian Institution.

One of the main goals of the biological and ecological diversity field research projects is to be able to fully understand the biodiversity within the reserve. Once a total inventory and base understanding of all taxa is complete, that information can be used to determine how to best protect, manage, enrich or restore biodiversity within El Eden and similar reserves.
