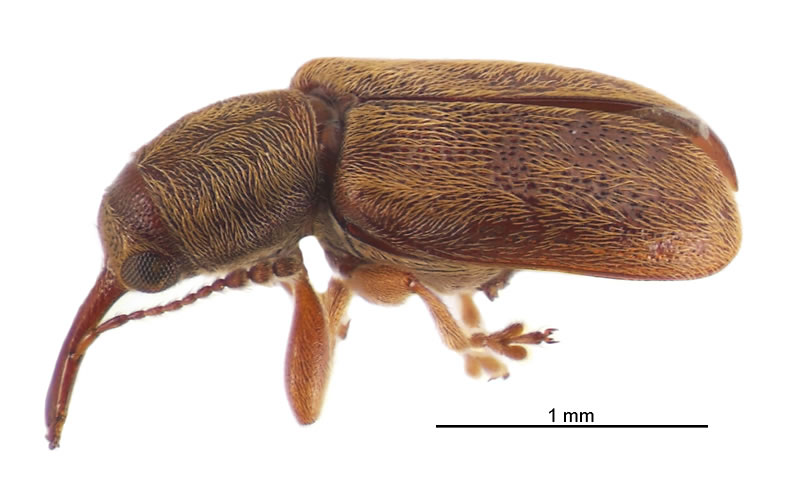

Scientific classification
- Kingdom: Animalia
- Phylum: Arthropoda
- Class: Insecta
- Order: Coleoptera
- Suborder: Polyphaga
- Infraorder: Cucujiformia
- Family: Nemonychidae
- Subfamily: Rhinorhynchinae
- Tribe: Rhinorhynchini
- Genus: Rhinorhynchus
- Species: R. rufulus

Binomial name
- Rhinorhynchus rufulus (Broun, 1880)

Synonyms
- Rhinomacer rufulus Broun, 1880; Rhinorhynchus zealandicus Sharpe, 1882

= Rhinorhynchus rufulus =

Species of beetle

Rhinorhynchus rufulus is a weevil in the Nemonychidae family. It is endemic to New Zealand and was first described by Thomas Broun in 1880. This species is found in both the North, South and Stewart Islands from the sub-alpine zone down to sea-level. Adults can be observed all months of the year. Host plants of this weevil species are conifer trees including Podocarpus nivalis and Lepidothamnus laxifolius.

== Taxonomy ==
This species was first described by Thomas Broun in 1880 and originally named Rhinomacer rufula using a damaged specimen collected in Tairua. In 2003 Guillermo Kuschel discussed this species and was unable to locate the holotype specimen used by Broun to describe this species. He chose a specimen held at the Natural History Museum, London which was collected in Wellington as the neotype to replace the lost holotype.

== Description ==
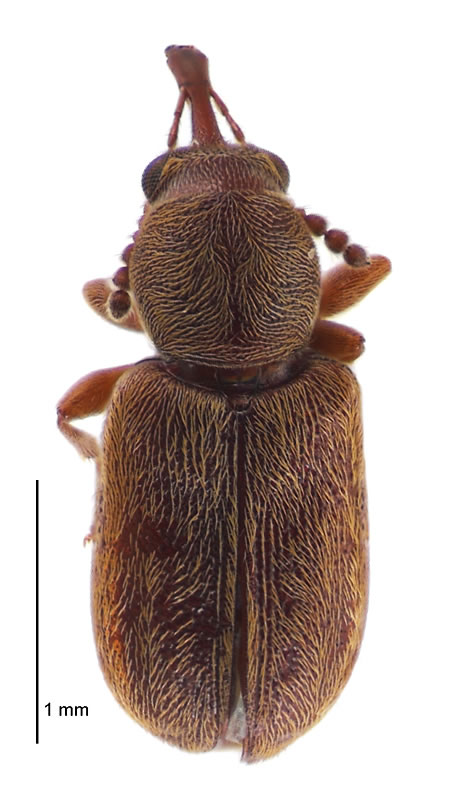
Dorsal view of R. rufulus.

Broun originally described the species as follows:

Rufous, moderately shining, pilose, antennae and legs fulvous. Antenna inserted at the middle of the rostrum, moderately stout, eight-jointed, club three-jointed; the two basal joints are of nearly equal length, and, together, nearly half as long as the rest conjointly; third and fourth elongate, each a little shorter than the fifth; sixth to eighth about equal; the club is loosely articulated, its basal joint somewhat cup-shaped, second largest, sub-quadrate, apical. Rostrum rather slender, elongate, somewhat deflexed and arcuated, proceeding from the lower part of the head; its basal half is narrow and cylindrical, a little incrassated near the eyes, the apical half is abruptly (but not greatly) dilated; mandibles prominent; it is of a shining rufous colour, and quite nude. Head punctate, nearly as broad as the thorax, short, deflexed in front; eyes moderately large and prominent, nearly circular. Thorax oviform, longer than broad, the sides regularly rounded, base sub-truncate, disc finely punctured. Elytra oblong, wider than the thorax, somewhat emarginated at the base, shoulders obtuse, the sides nearly parallel and rounded apically; the disc, owing to slight basal and posterior elevations, exhibits a subdepressed aspect; they are punctate but not perceptibly striated. The legs are moderately long, the femora inflated, tibise straight, not spined; tarsi stout, basal joint obconical, more slender but rather longer than the second, which is triangular, the penultimate is bilobed, the apical elongate. Scutellum small, somewhat transverse. The body is clothed with sub-depressed stiff fulvous hairs, the legs and antennae nearly nude. The fifth joint of the antennae is obconical and stouter than the others.

Kuschel pointed out that the above description is based on the female of the species.

== Distribution ==
This species is endemic to New Zealand and is found in the North, South and Stewart Islands from sub-alpine altitudes down to sea-level.

== Habitat and hosts ==
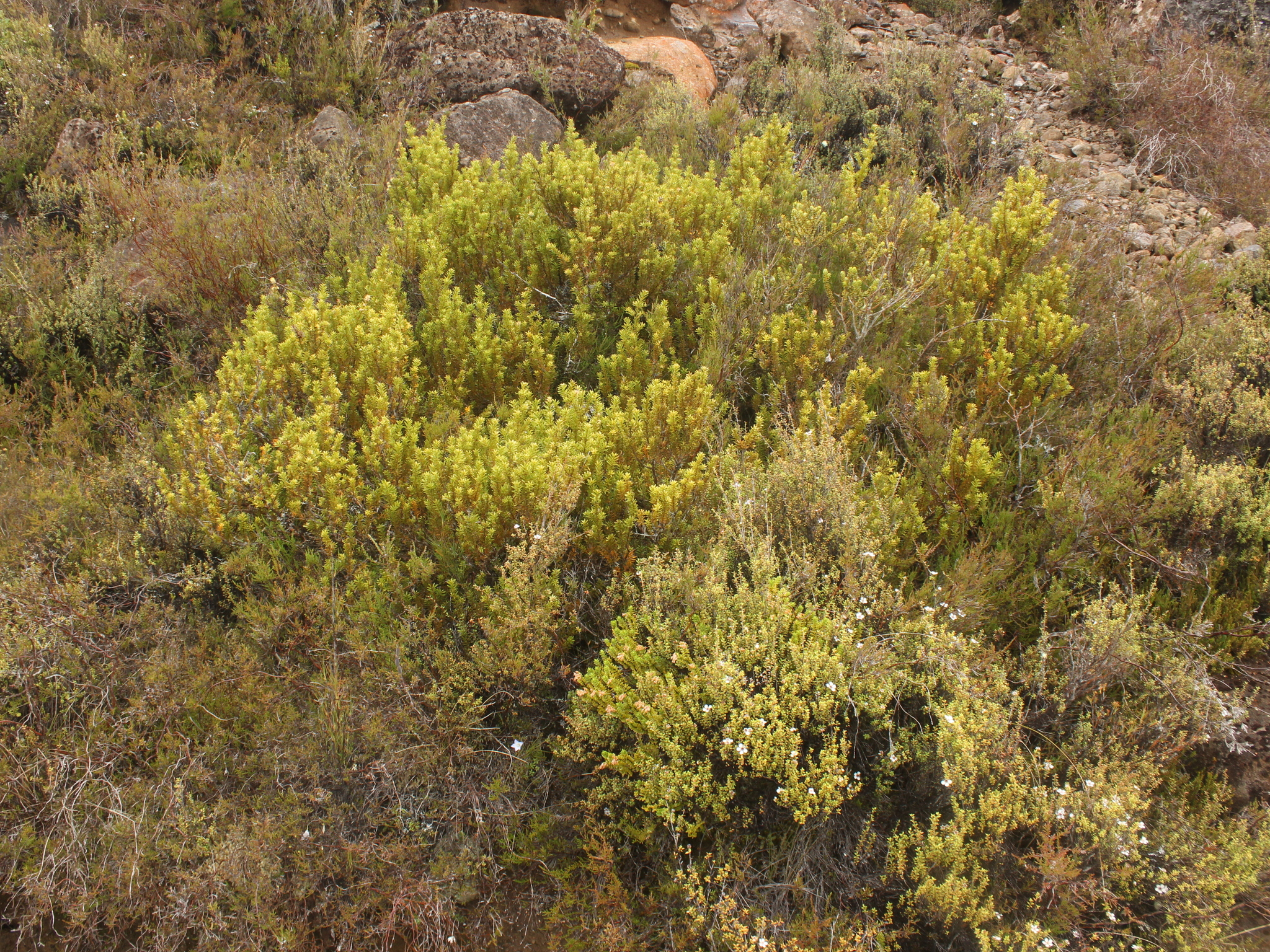
Host species P. nivalis.

The host plants of this weevil are conifer tree species found in the following genera: Phyllocladus, Dacrycarpus, Dacrydium, Halocarpus, Lepidothamnus, Manoao, Podocarpus, and Prumnopitys. This weevil is commonly found on Podocarpus nivalis and Lepidothamnus laxifolius.

== Behaviour ==
Adults of this species have been observed during all months of the year.
