= Cimberis compta =

Scientific classification
- Kingdom: Animalia
- Phylum: Arthropoda
- Class: Insecta
- Order: Coleoptera
- Suborder: Polyphaga
- Infraorder: Cucujiformia
- Family: Nemonychidae
- Genus: Cimberis
- Species: C. compta

Binomial name
- Cimberis compta (LeConte in LeConte & Horn, 1876)

Species of beetle

Cimberis compta is a species of pine flower snout beetle in the family Nemonychidae. It is found in North America.
