= Lecontellus byturoides =

Scientific classification
- Kingdom: Animalia
- Phylum: Arthropoda
- Class: Insecta
- Order: Coleoptera
- Suborder: Polyphaga
- Infraorder: Cucujiformia
- Family: Nemonychidae
- Genus: Lecontellus
- Species: L. byturoides

Binomial name
- Lecontellus byturoides (LeConte, 1880)

Species of beetle

Lecontellus byturoides is a species of pine flower snout beetle in the family Nemonychidae. It is found in North America.
