= Eobelinae =

Eobelinae Temporal range: Late Jurassic–Early Cretaceous

Scientific classification
- Kingdom: Animalia
- Phylum: Arthropoda
- Clade: Pancrustacea
- Class: Insecta
- Order: Coleoptera
- Suborder: Polyphaga
- Infraorder: Cucujiformia
- Family: Nemonychidae
- Subfamily: †Eobelinae; Arnoldi, 1977

Genera
- 9, see text

Synonyms
- †Eobelini

Extinct subfamily of beetles

Eobelinae are an extinct weevil subfamily that thrived in the late Mesozoic. They belong to the family Nemonychidae. The Eobelidae were widespread, occurring at least in Central Asia, Spain and Brazil during the Late Jurassic and Early Cretaceous (about 161 to 100 million years ago).

== Description ==
Adult Eobelinae are recognizable by their elongated and flat body and long rostrum ("snout"), the latter being longer than the head and pronotum together. Like in other belids, their antennae were straight, not elbowed as in the true weevils (Curculionidae); they insert near the rostrum's center. The "forehead" between the rostrum base and the eyes has a marked outward bulge. The tibiae of the middle and hind legs have spurs at their tips.

Their larvae are unknown. Presumably, they fed on the wood and fruits of diseased or dying plants or on deadwood, with healthy plants less important as food.

== Systematics ==
Genera:

- †Archaeorrhynchus Martynov, 1926 (Late Jurassic of Kazakhstan)
- †Belonotaris Arnoldi, 1977 (Late Jurassic of Kazakhstan - Early Cretaceous of Russia)
- †Davidibelus Zherikhin & Gratshev, 2004 (Early Cretaceous of Brazil)
- †Eobelus Arnoldi, 1977 (Late Jurassic of Kazakhstan)
- †Longidorsum Zhang, 1977 (Early Cretaceous of China)
- †Microprobelus Ming, Dong & Chungkun, 2006 (Yixian Early Cretaceous of Lingyuan City, China)
- †Montsecbelus Zherikhin & Gratshev, 1997 (Early Cretaceous of Spain)
- †Probelopsis Arnoldi, 1977 (Late Jurassic of Kazakhstan)
- †Probelus Arnoldi, 1977 (Late Jurassic of Karatau Range, Kazakhstan - Yixian Early Cretaceous of Hebei, China)
