= Cimberis turbans =

Scientific classification
- Kingdom: Animalia
- Phylum: Arthropoda
- Class: Insecta
- Order: Coleoptera
- Suborder: Polyphaga
- Infraorder: Cucujiformia
- Family: Nemonychidae
- Genus: Cimberis
- Species: C. turbans

Binomial name
- Cimberis turbans Kuschel, 1989

Species of beetle

Cimberis turbans is a species of pine flower snout beetle in the family Nemonychidae. It is found in North America.
