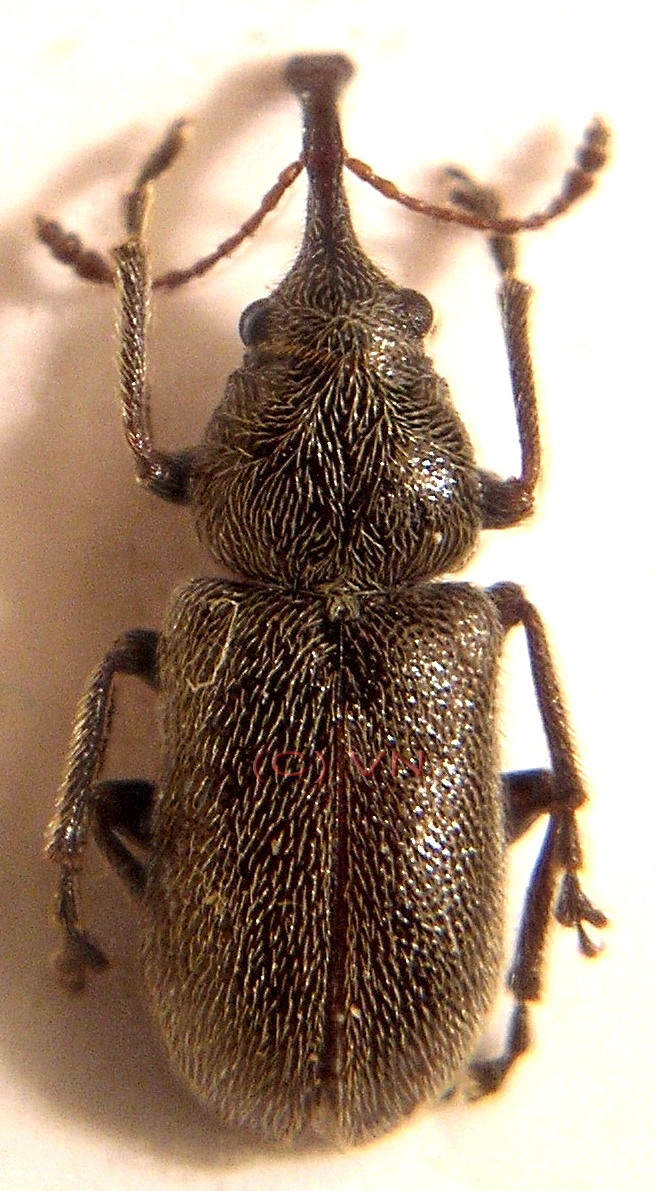
- Doydirhynchus austriacus

Scientific classification
- Kingdom: Animalia
- Phylum: Arthropoda
- Clade: Pancrustacea
- Class: Insecta
- Order: Coleoptera
- Suborder: Polyphaga
- Infraorder: Cucujiformia
- Superfamily: Curculionoidea
- Family: Nemonychidae
- Genus: Doydirhynchus; Dejean, 1821

= Doydirhynchus =

Genus of beetles

Doydirhynchus is a genus of beetles belonging to the family Nemonychidae.

The species of this genus are found in Europe.

Species:

- Doydirhynchus austriacus (Olivier, 1807)
- Doydirhynchus bicolor Kuschel, 1993
