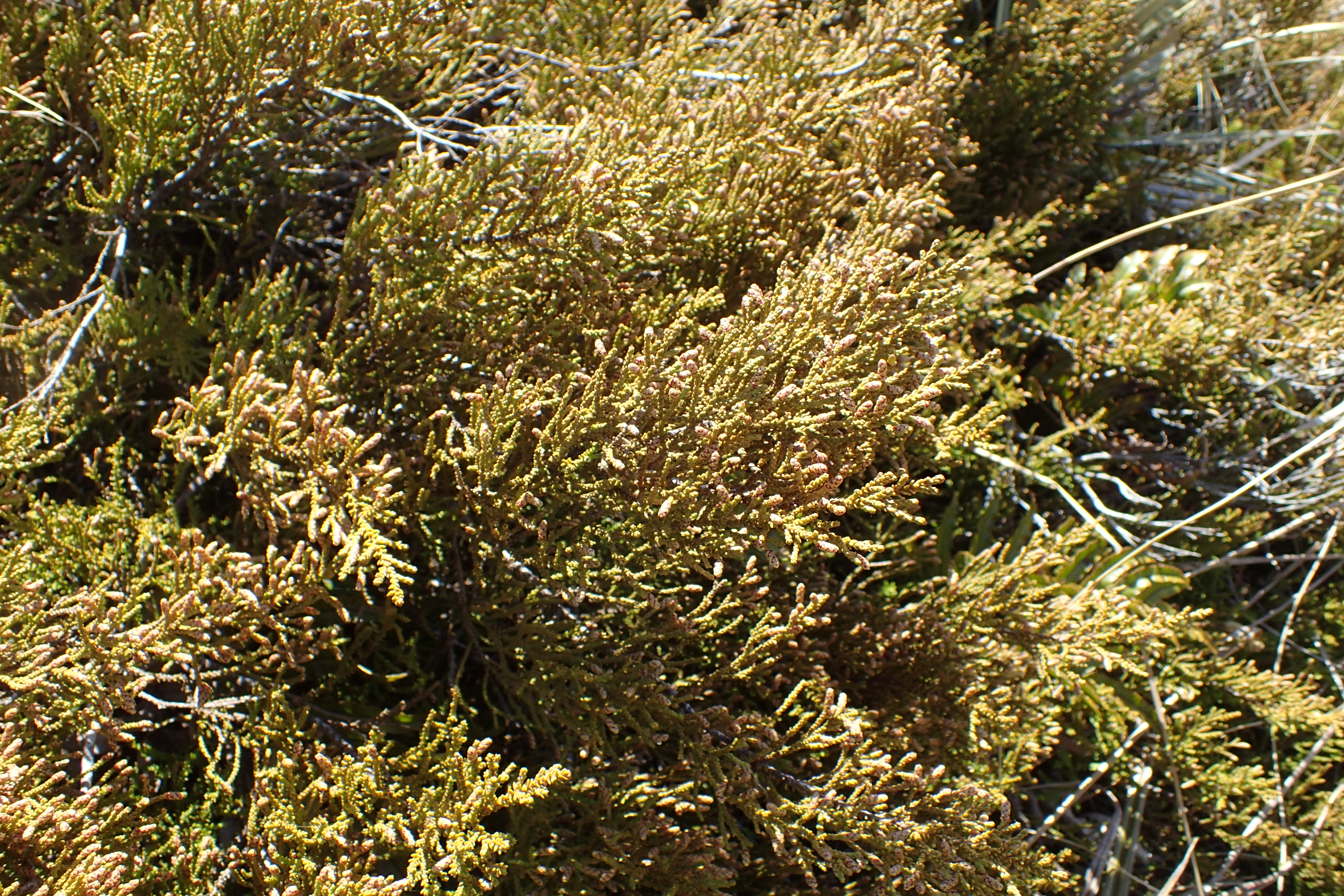
- Lepidothamnus laxifolius

Scientific classification
- Kingdom: Plantae
- Clade: Tracheophytes
- Clade: Gymnosperms
- Division: Pinophyta
- Class: Pinopsida
- Order: Araucariales
- Family: Podocarpaceae
- Genus: Lepidothamnus; Phil.

Type species
- Lepidothamnus fonkii Phil.

Species
- L. fonkii; L. intermedius; L. laxifolius

= Lepidothamnus =

Genus of conifers

Lepidothamnus is a genus of conifers in the family Podocarpaceae, containing three species of dioecious or monoecious trees and shrubs, and creepers. L. intermedius and L. laxifolius are native to New Zealand. L. fonkii is native to the Magellanic subpolar forests ecoregion of southern Argentina and Chile, where it grows as a low shrub or creeper in moorlands and bogs.

== Phylogeny ==
Phylogeny of Lepidothamnus

- - L. fonkii Philippi (Chilean pygmy cedar)
  - - L. intermedius (Kirk) Quinn (Yellow silver pine)
    - L. laxifolius (Hooker) Quinn (pygmy pine)
