= Acromacer =

Scientific classification
- Kingdom: Animalia
- Phylum: Arthropoda
- Class: Insecta
- Order: Coleoptera
- Suborder: Polyphaga
- Infraorder: Cucujiformia
- Family: Nemonychidae
- Genus: Acromacer; Kuschel, 1989

Genus of beetles

Acromacer is a genus of pine flower snout beetles in the family Nemonychidae. There is one described species in Acromacer, A. bombifrons.
