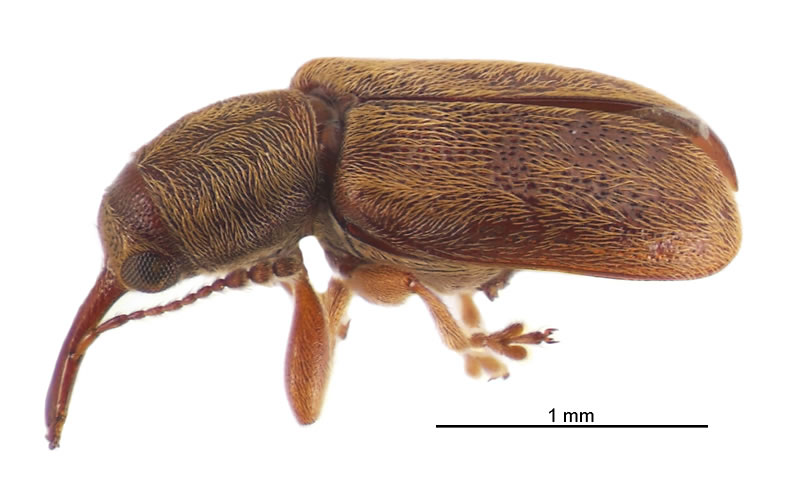
- Rhinorhynchus rufulus

Scientific classification
- Kingdom: Animalia
- Phylum: Arthropoda
- Class: Insecta
- Order: Coleoptera
- Suborder: Polyphaga
- Infraorder: Cucujiformia
- Family: Nemonychidae
- Tribe: Rhinorhynchini
- Genus: Rhinorhynchus; Sharp, 1882

= Rhinorhynchus =

Genus of beetles

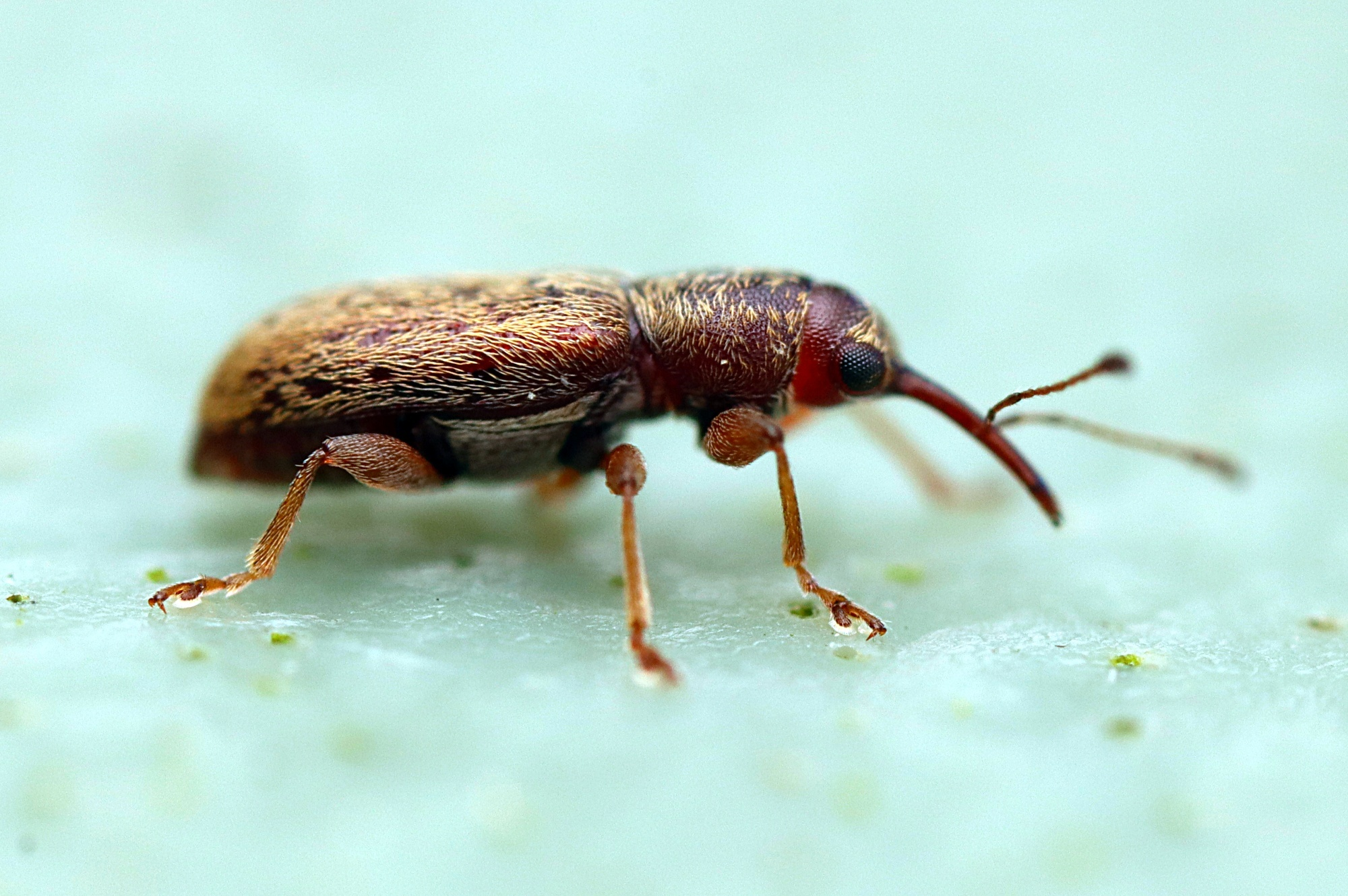
Rhinorhynchus rufulus, New Zealand

Rhinorhynchus is a genus of beetles in the family Nemonychidae. There are about five described species in Rhinorhynchus, found in New Zealand.

== Species ==
These five species belong to the genus Rhinorhynchus:

- Rhinorhynchus halli Kuschel, 2003
- Rhinorhynchus halocarpi Kuschel, 2003
- Rhinorhynchus phyllocladi Kuschel, 2003
- Rhinorhynchus rufulus
- Rhinorhynchus zealandicus Sharp, 1882
