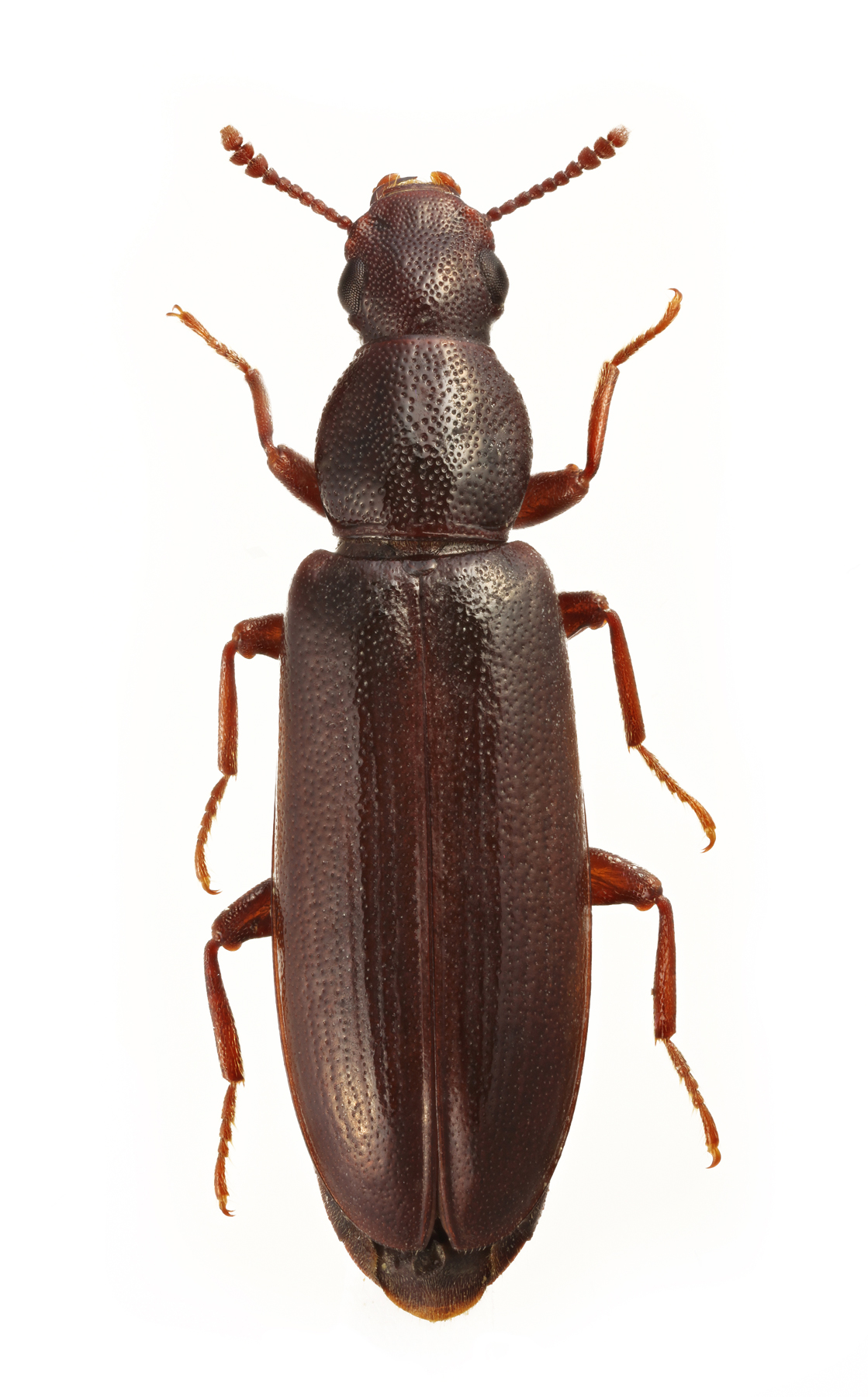

Scientific classification
- Kingdom: Animalia
- Phylum: Arthropoda
- Class: Insecta
- Order: Coleoptera
- Suborder: Polyphaga
- Infraorder: Cucujiformia
- Family: Boridae
- Genus: Boros
- Species: B. schneideri

Binomial name
- Boros schneideri (Panzer, 1795)

= Boros schneideri =

Species of beetle

Boros schneideri (Panzer, 1795) is a species of beetle belonging to the family Boridae.

It is native to parts of Finland and lives in dead pines and forests. The adult beetle is 11-13mm long and the larvae reach up to 30mm.
