= Lecontellus =

Scientific classification
- Kingdom: Animalia
- Phylum: Arthropoda
- Class: Insecta
- Order: Coleoptera
- Suborder: Polyphaga
- Infraorder: Cucujiformia
- Family: Nemonychidae
- Genus: Lecontellus; Kuschel, 1989

Type species
- Doydirhynchus byturoides LeConte, 1880, by original designation.

Species
- Lecontellus byturoides; Lecontellus pinicola; Lecontellus slevini

Genus of beetles

Lecontellus is a weevil genus.
