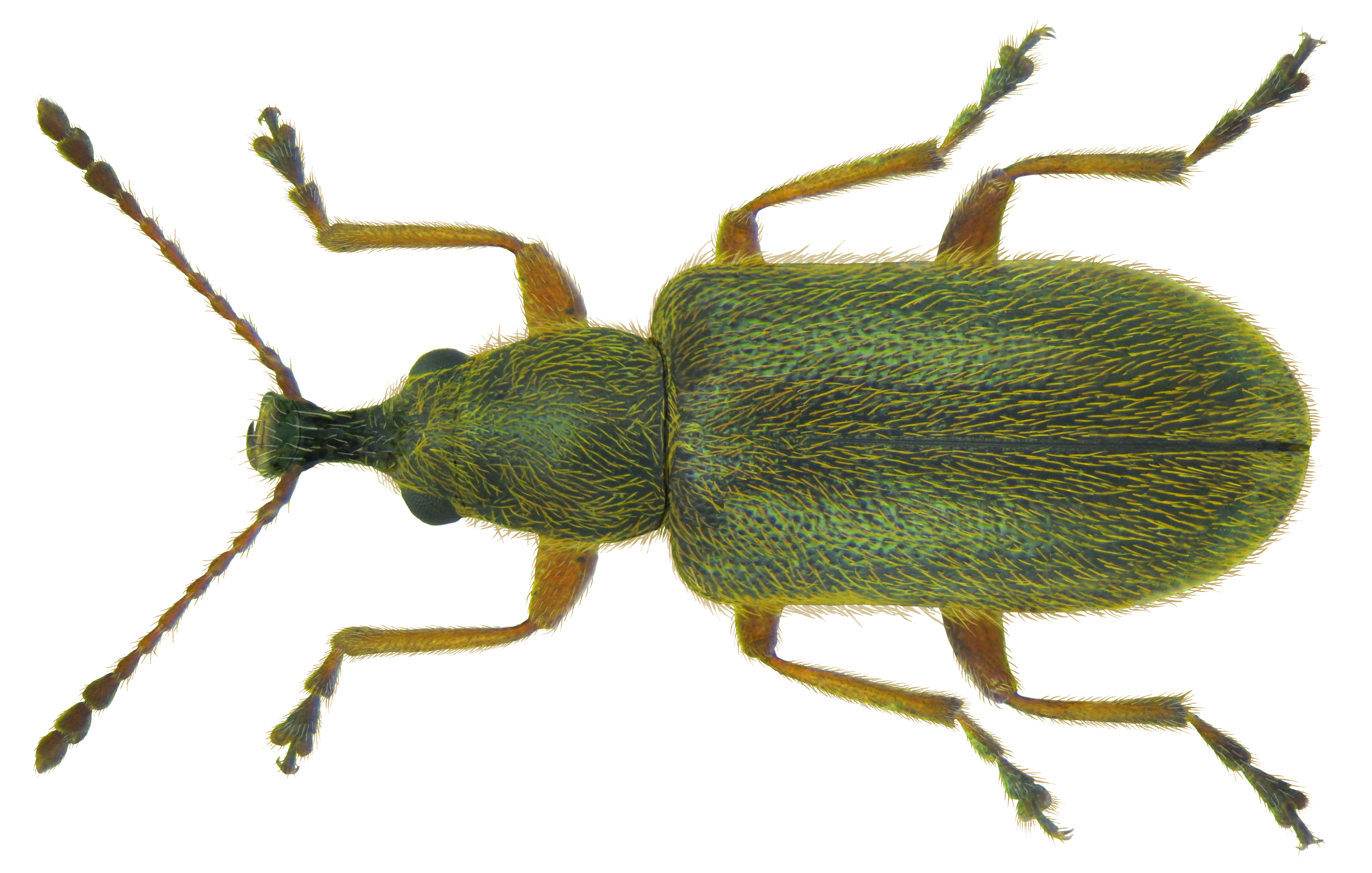
- Cimberis attelaboides

Scientific classification
- Domain: Eukaryota
- Kingdom: Animalia
- Phylum: Arthropoda
- Class: Insecta
- Order: Coleoptera
- Suborder: Polyphaga
- Infraorder: Cucujiformia
- Family: Nemonychidae
- Genus: Cimberis; Gozis, 1881

= Cimberis =

Genus of beetles

Cimberis is a genus of pine flower snout beetles in the family Nemonychidae. There are about 10 described species in Cimberis.

== Species ==
These 10 species belong to the genus Cimberis:

- Cimberis attelaboides (Fabricius & J.C., 1787)
- Cimberis bihirsuta Hatch, 1971
- Cimberis bihirsutus Hatch, 1972
- Cimberis compta (LeConte in LeConte & Horn, 1876)
- Cimberis decipiens Kuschel, 1989
- Cimberis elongata (LeConte in LeConte & Horn, 1876)
- Cimberis pallipennis (Blatchley & Leng, 1916)
- Cimberis parvulus Hatch, 1972
- Cimberis pilosa (LeConte in LeConte & Horn, 1876)
- Cimberis turbans Kuschel, 1989
