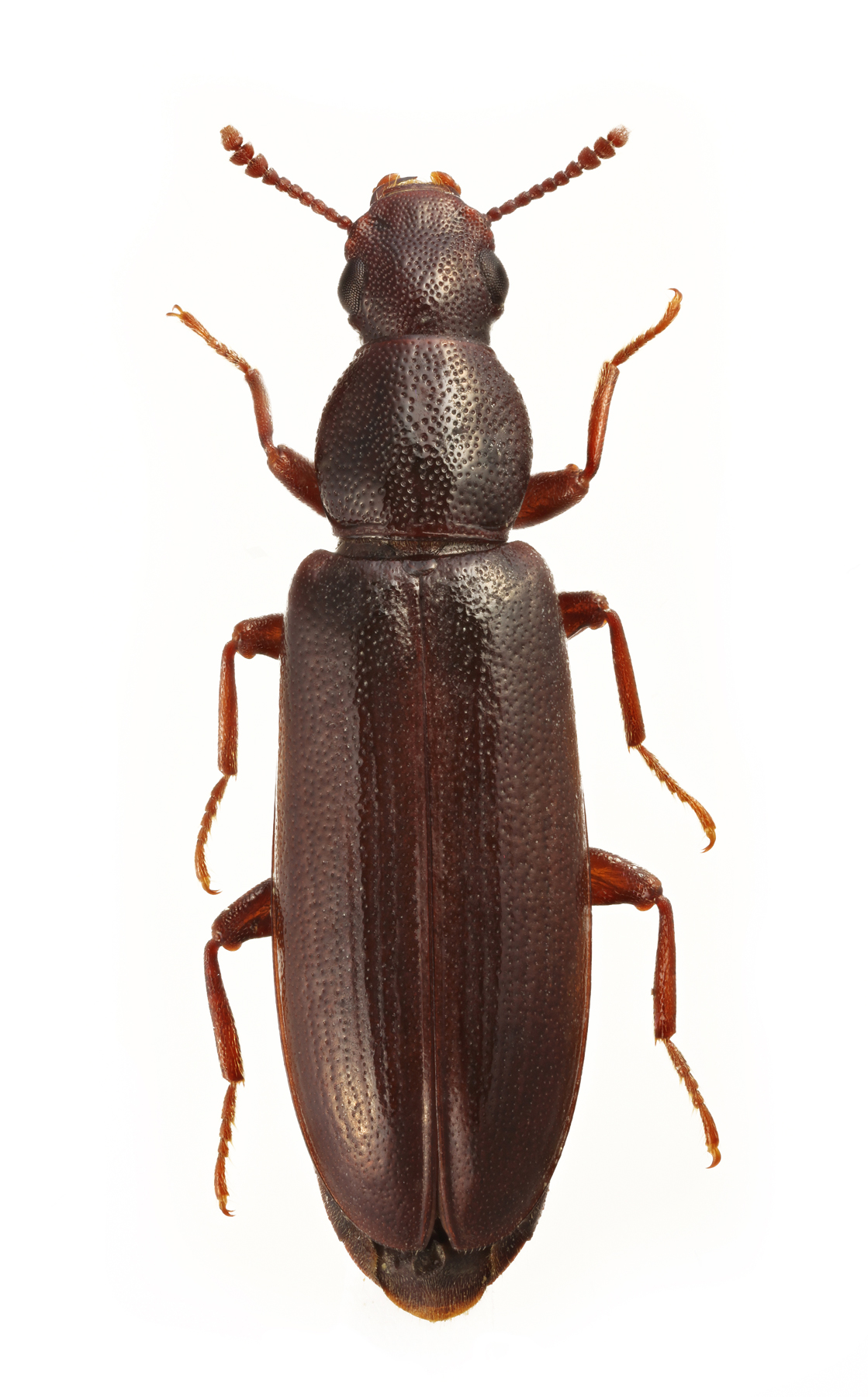
- Boros schneideri

Scientific classification
- Kingdom: Animalia
- Phylum: Arthropoda
- Class: Insecta
- Order: Coleoptera
- Suborder: Polyphaga
- Infraorder: Cucujiformia
- Family: Boridae
- Genus: Boros; Herbst, 1797

= Boros (beetle) =

Genus of beetles

Boros is a genus of conifer bark beetles in the family Boridae. There are at least two described species in Boros.

== Species ==
These two species belong to the genus Boros:

- Boros schneideri (Panzer, 1795)^{g}
- Boros unicolor Say, 1827^{i c g b}

Data sources: i = ITIS, c = Catalogue of Life, g = GBIF, b = Bugguide.net
