= Magellanic subpolar forests =

Ecoregion of southernmost South America

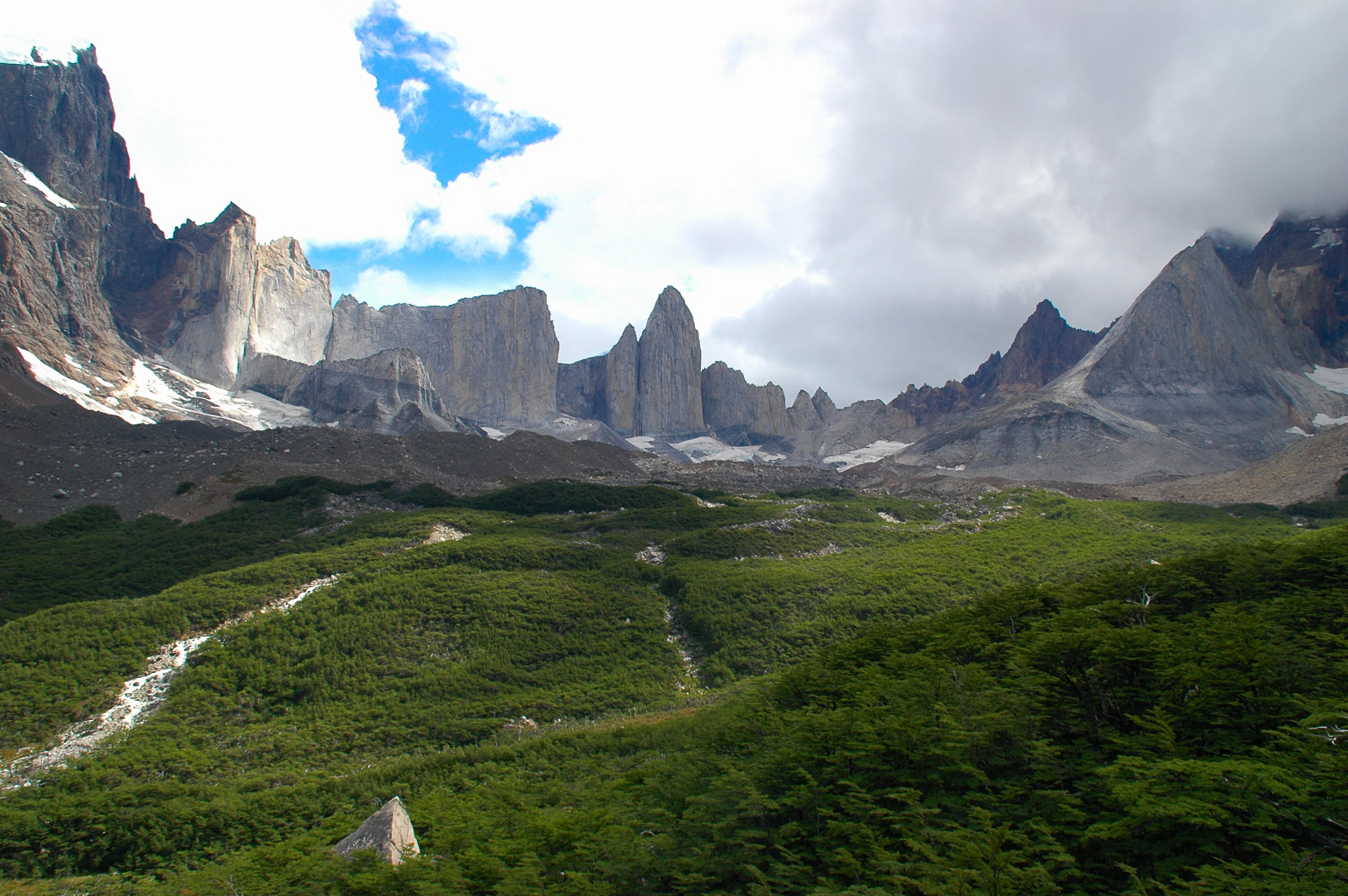
- View of a Magellanic lenga forest close to the tree line in Torres del Paine National Park, Chile

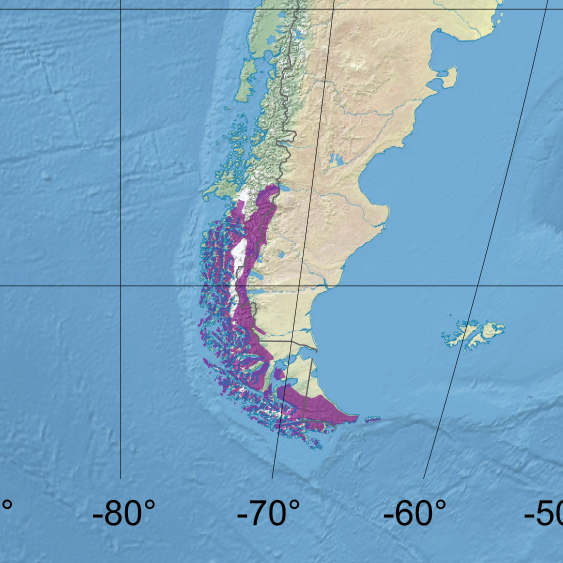
- Ecoregion territory (in purple)

Ecology
- Realm: Neotropical
- Biome: temperate broadleaf and mixed forests
- Borders: Patagonian steppe; Valdivian temperate forests

Geography
- Area: 150,500 km^{2} (58,100 mi^{2})
- Countries: Chile; Argentina

Conservation
- Protected: 69,938 km² (46%)

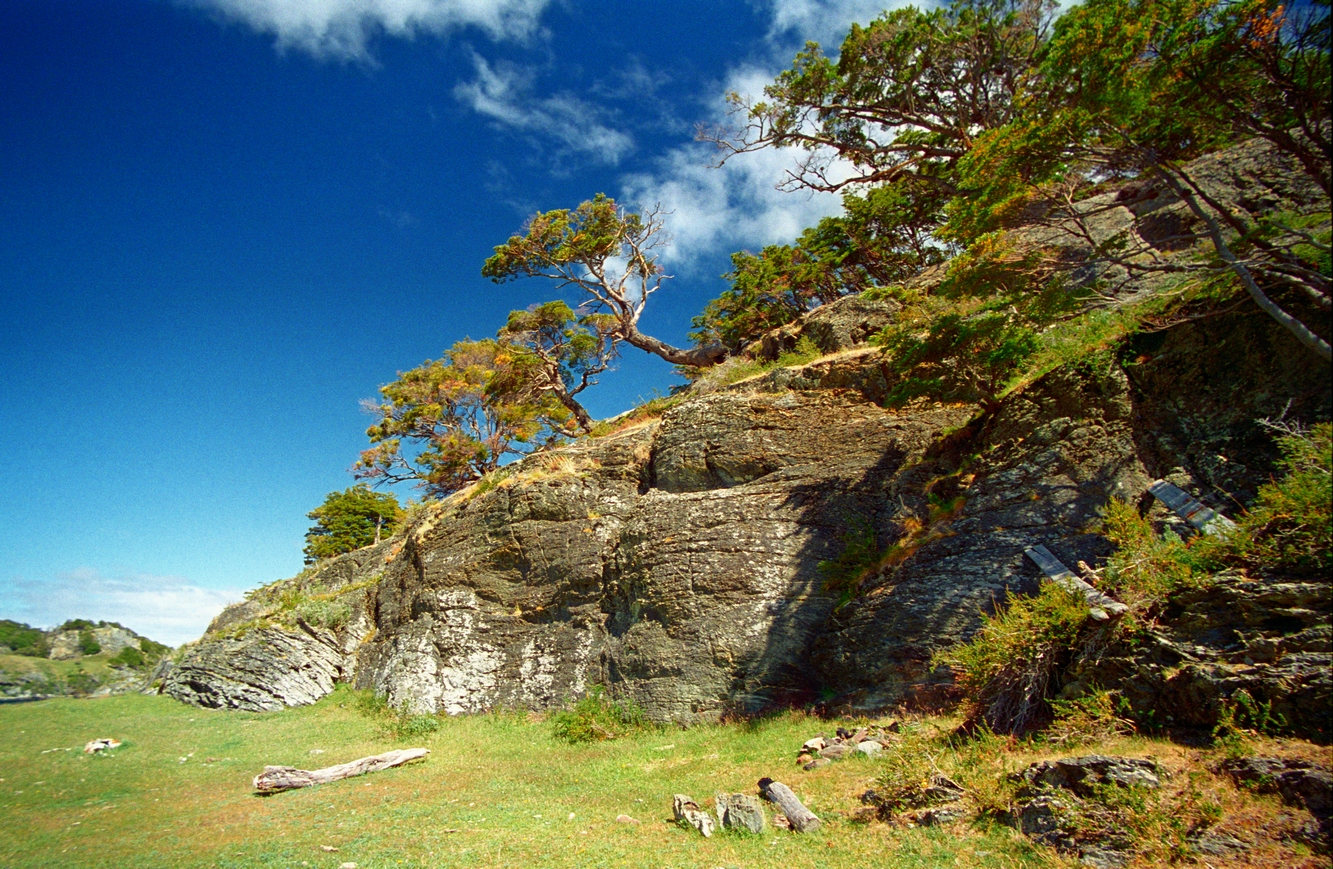
Harberton, Tierra del Fuego, Argentina.

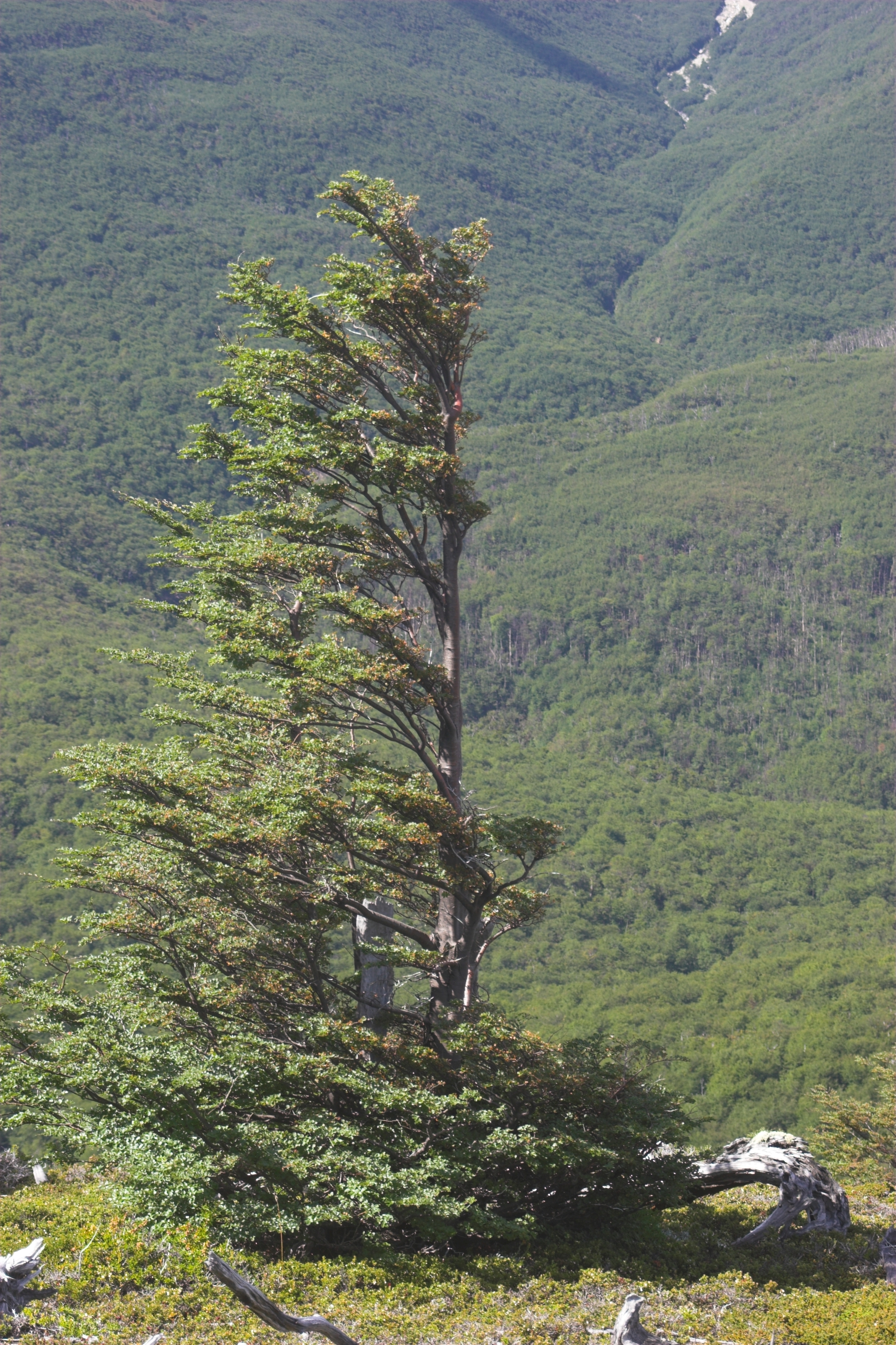
Windswept or "flag" tree, Torres del Paine National Park, Chile – "The wind only blows from the west".

The Magellanic subpolar forests (Spanish: Bosque subpolar magallánico) are a terrestrial ecoregion of southernmost South America, covering parts of southern Chile and Argentina, and are part of the Neotropical realm. It is a temperate broadleaf and mixed forests ecoregion, and contains the world's southernmost forests.

== Setting ==
The Magellanic subpolar forests ecoregion lies to the west of the Andes Mountains, which run north-south for most of their length but curve eastward near the southern tip of South America, terminating at the archipelago of Tierra del Fuego. The Magellanic ecoregion was covered by glaciers during the last ice age, and the landscape is deeply dissected by fjords, with numerous islands, inlets, and channels, including the Strait of Magellan, which separates Tierra del Fuego from the South American mainland and is the route taken by Portuguese explorer Ferdinand Magellan from the South Atlantic to the South Pacific. North of roughly 48° south latitude lies the Valdivian temperate forests ecoregion, which shares many affinities with the Magellanic ecoregion in plant and animal life. To the east lie the drier temperate grasslands and shrublands ecoregions of Patagonia, which are in the rain shadow of the Andean and Fuegian mountains.

== Climate ==
The Andean and Fuegan mountains intercept moisture-laden westerly winds, creating temperate rain forest conditions, while the cold oceanic Humboldt Current, which runs up the west coast of South America, and the cold Antarctic Circumpolar Current, which runs from west to east through the Southern Ocean, keep the Magellanic ecoregion cool and wet, and the strong oceanic influence moderates seasonal temperature extremes. Average annual temperatures vary from 6 °C (42.8 °F) in the north to 3 °C (37.4 °F) in the south and annual rainfall from 4,000 mm (157 in) in the west to 450 mm (17.7 in) in the east. Snowfalls are very common in the west and can occur even in summer. Fog is very frequent. Very strong winds whip the region compelling trees to grow in twisted and bent shapes known as flag trees.

== Flora ==
Like the Valdivian ecoregion, the Magellanic subpolar forests are a refuge for the Antarctic flora, and share many plant families with the temperate forest ecoregions of New Zealand, Tasmania, and Australia, especially the southern beech (Nothofagus). Species of Nothofagus, including N. betuloides, N. antarctica, and N. pumilio, are the characteristic trees of the Magellanic ecoregion. The Magellanic ecoregion does not have the same species richness as the milder Valdivian ecoregion, both on account of its colder climate and its recent glaciation. The advancing glaciers caused the forests to retreat far to the north, and the region was gradually reforested starting about 10,000 years ago when the climate warmed and the glaciers began retreating.

The Magellanic ecoregion has three main plant communities: the Magellanic moorland, the evergreen Magellanic rainforest, and the deciduous Magellanic forest.

The Magellanic moorland occurs on the western edge of the region where the oceanic influence is strongest. High rainfall of 5,000 mm/a (197 in/a) is typical of the moorland, as are cool temperatures, strong winds, bad drainage conditions, and rocky ground with generally thin soil. Most of the moorland consists of a mosaic of low-growing plants, including dwarf shrubs and wind-sheared trees, cushion plants, grasses, and mosses. These plants can form an underlayer of blanket peat and boggy areas. In more sheltered areas, small stands of evergreen forest can be found, which include Nothofagus betuloides, Drimys winteri, Lepidothamnus fonkii, and Pilgerodendron uviferum.

Farther from the ocean, in more moderate areas less exposed to the oceanic wind and rain, moorland yields to evergreen Magellanic rainforest. The Magellanic rainforest is mostly made up Nothofagus betuloides, together with other evergreen trees, most often Drimys winteri and Pilgerodendron uviferum, and occasionally Embothrium coccineum and Maytenus magellanica. In the better established forest stands, a species-rich shrub layer may develop. In exposed, rocky, and poorly drained areas, pockets of deciduous Nothofagus antarctica and the typical moorland species can be found.

As one moves further east, where rainfall decreases to 800–850 mm/a (31.5–33.5 in/a), Nothofagus betuloides becomes less dominant and mixes with deciduous Nothofagus pumilio in the transition to the deciduous forest community. The Magellanic deciduous forest is made up mostly of Nothofagus pumilio and Nothofagus antarctica. When one reaches the drier rain shadow east of the mountains, the forests disappear, transitioning to the grassland ecoregions of Patagonia.

In open spaces some succulent fruits can be found: Chilean strawberry (Fragaria chiloensis), and calafate (Berberis microphylla); they used to complement the nourishment of the (now almost nonexistent) native peoples.

These forests are peerless in their endurance of cold summers (averaging 9 degrees Celsius or 48.2 degrees Fahrenheit at sea level) and violent subpolar winds. Due to these traits, Magellanic forests' tree species are exported to other parts of the world such as the Faroe Islands and neighboring archipelagos with similar conditions where trees from other biomes in the world cannot grow. The following species from Tierra del Fuego, Drimys winteri, Nothofagus antarctica, Nothofagus pumilio, and Nothofagus betuloides, have been successfully introduced to the Faroe Islands. As a general rule, Fueguian trees show better signs of acclimation than those from Continental Northern Europe to conditions in the Faroe Islands.

== Fauna ==
The Magellanic subpolar forests are home to the southern pudu (Pudu puda), the world's smallest deer, which stands only 35–45 cm (14–18 inches) high at the shoulder. Other animal species include the cougar (Puma concolor) and the endangered southern river otter (Lontra provocax). Endemic rodents include the Patagonian mara, the long-clawed mole mouse, and the viscacha, a small rodent that looks almost like a rabbit with a long, bushy tail.

Native bird species include the Magellanic woodpecker (Campephilus magellanicus), Patagonian sierra finch (Phrygilus patagonicus), Patagonian mockingbird (Mimus patagonicus), and Andean condor (Vultur gryphus).

The rich Magellanic coastal waters and numerous rocky islets host many seabirds, including albatrosses, auks, gulls, terns, and penguins.

== Protected areas ==
A 2017 assessment found that 69,938 km², or 46%, of the ecoregion is in protected areas.

=== Argentina ===
- Los Glaciares National Park
- Perito Moreno National Park
- Tierra del Fuego National Park

=== Chile ===
- Alberto de Agostini National Park
- Bernardo O'Higgins National Park
- Cabo de Hornos National Park
- Katalalixar National Reserve
- Kawésqar National Park
- Laguna San Rafael National Park
- Patagonia National Park
- Torres del Paine National Park
- Yendegaia National Park
