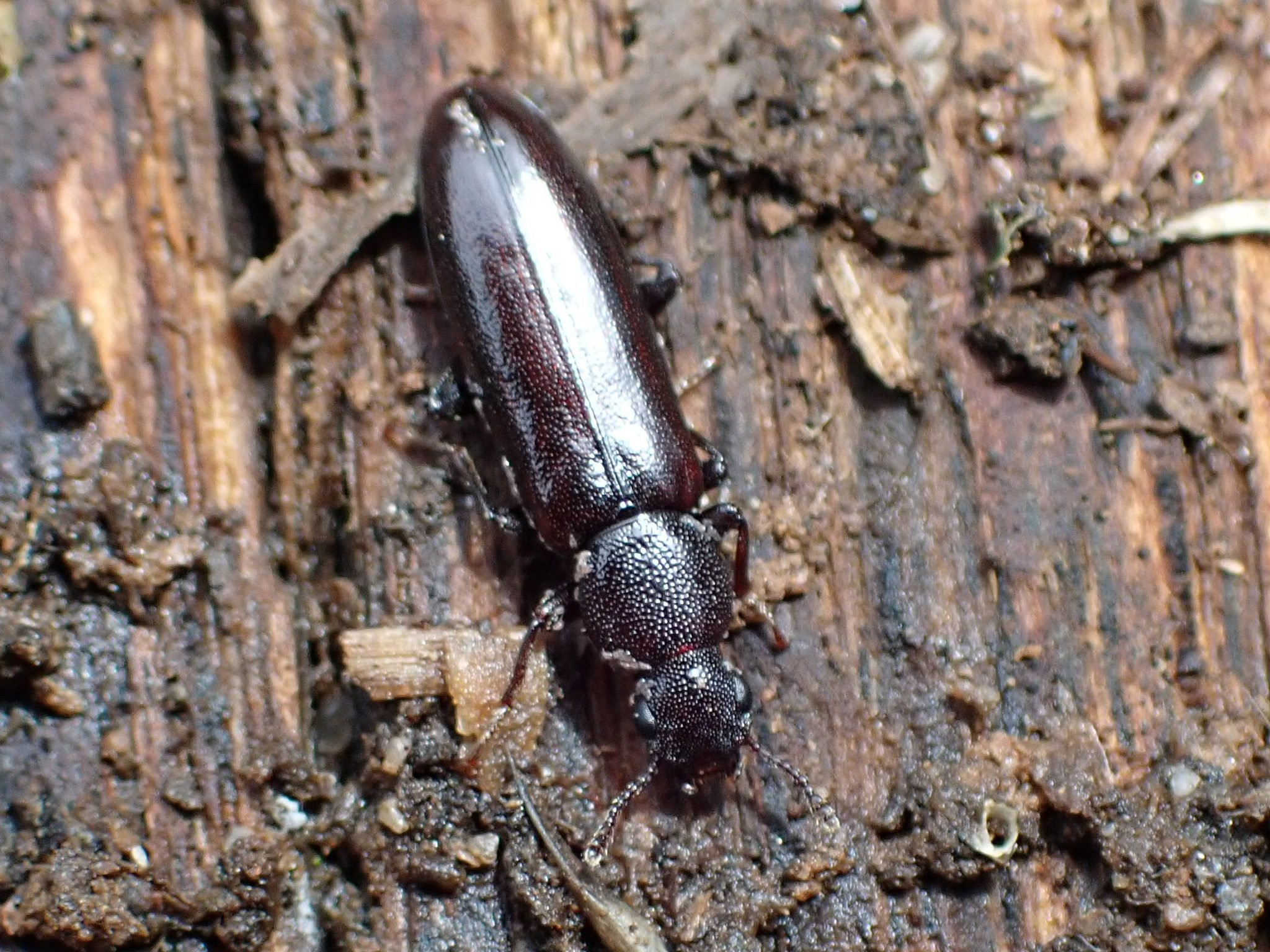
- Boros unicolor
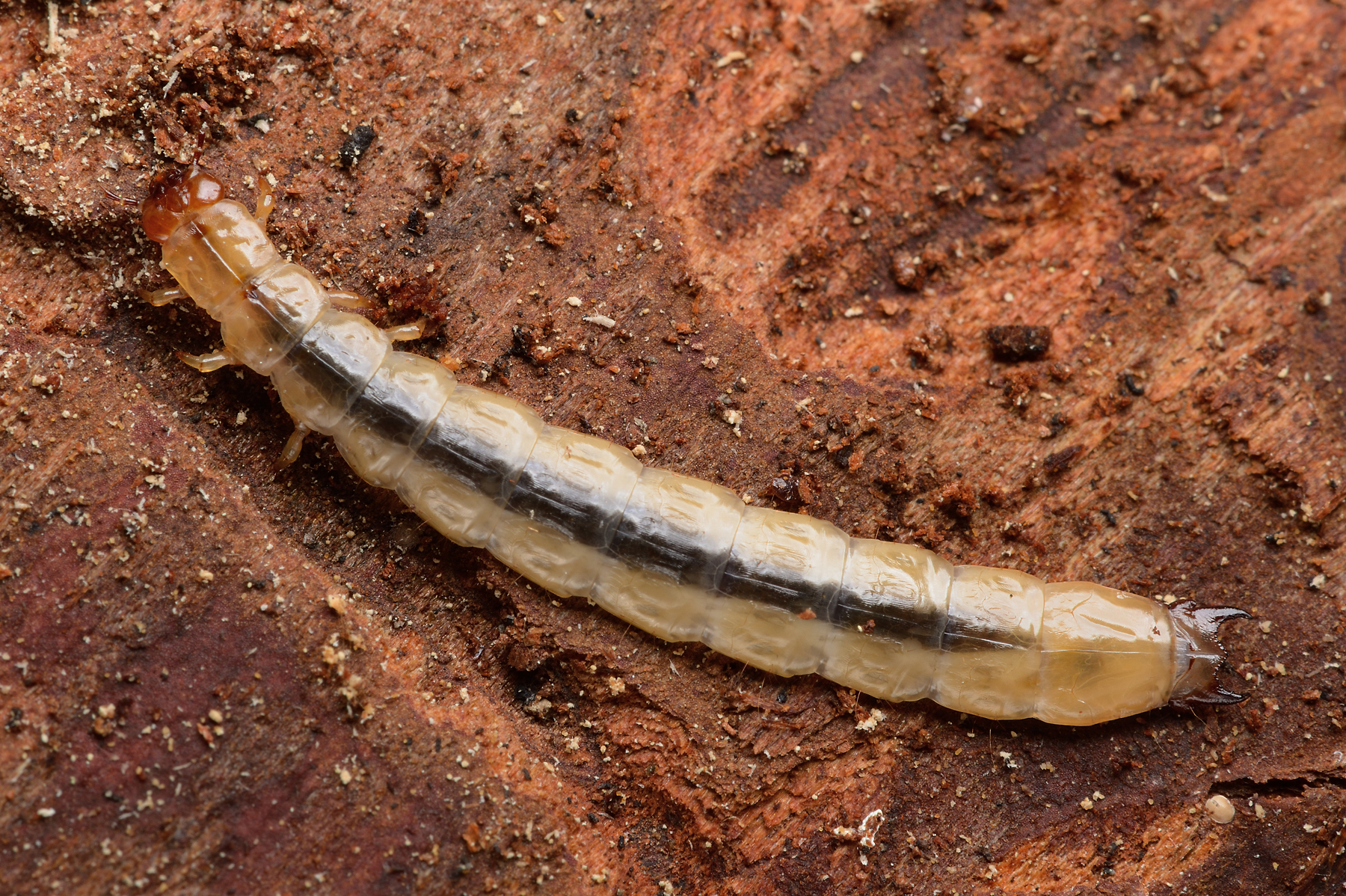
- Boros schneideri larva

Scientific classification
- Kingdom: Animalia
- Phylum: Arthropoda
- Class: Insecta
- Order: Coleoptera
- Suborder: Polyphaga
- Infraorder: Cucujiformia
- Superfamily: Tenebrionoidea
- Family: Boridae; C. G. Thomson, 1859

Genera
- See text.

= Boridae =

Family of beetles

The Boridae are a small family of tenebrionoid beetles with no vernacular common name, though recent authors have coined the name conifer bark beetles. The family contains three genera. Boros is native to North America and northern Eurasia, Lecontia is endemic to North America, while Synercticus is found in Australia and New Guinea. The larvae of Boros are found under bark and are especially associated with standing dead trees (snags), typically pines, found in old-growth forests. Lecontia larvae are found inhabiting damp parts of the root system of dead standing trees. Little is known of the life habits of Synercticus.

== Taxonomy ==
- Genus Boros Herbst, 1797
  - Boros schneideri (Panzer, 1795)
  - Boros unicolor Say, 1827
- Genus Lecontia Champion, 1889
  - Lecontia discicollis LeConte, 1850
- Genus Synercticus Newman, 1842
  - Synercticus heteromerus Newman, 1842
