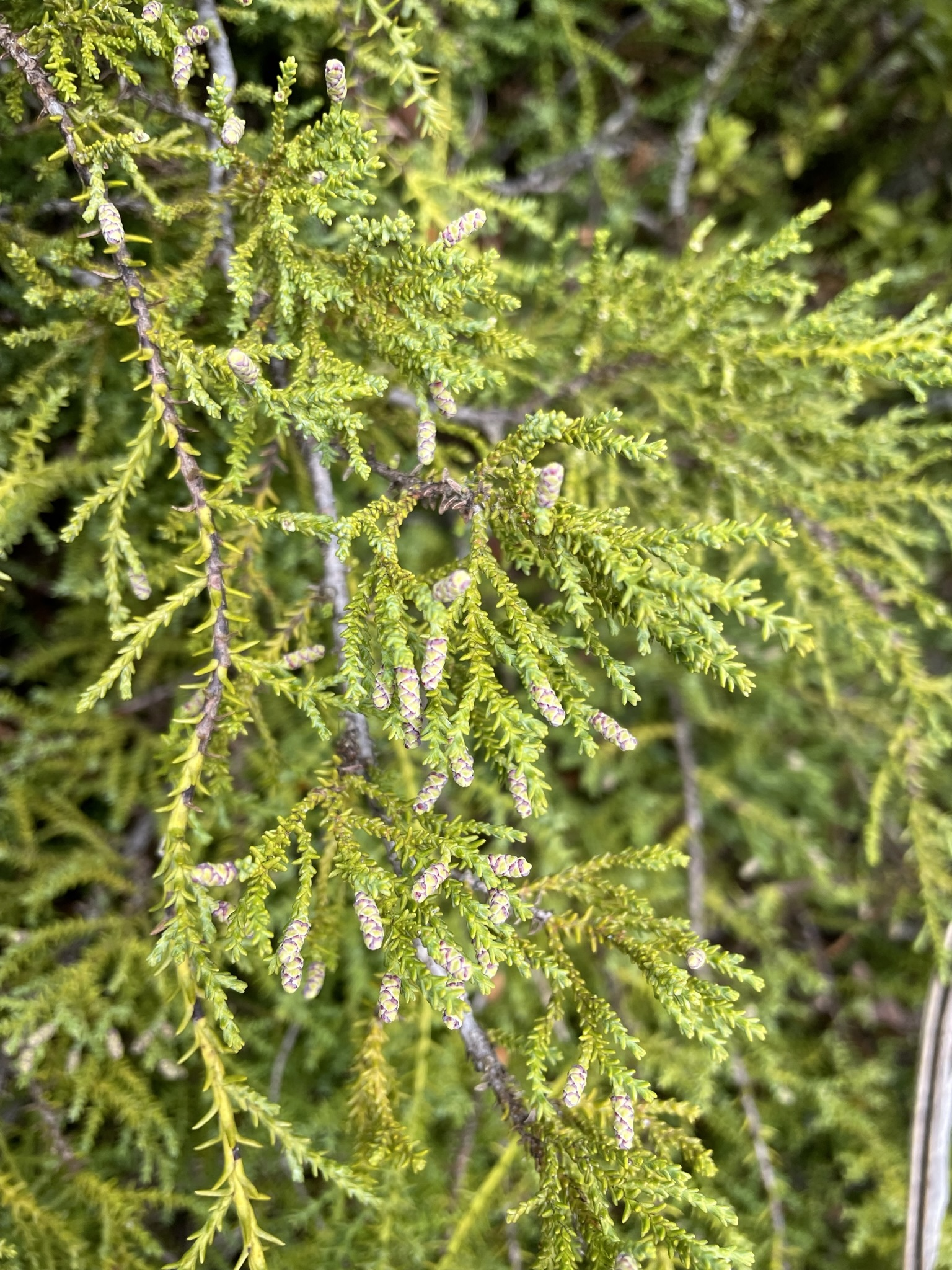
- Foliage

Conservation status
- Least Concern (IUCN 3.1)

Scientific classification
- Kingdom: Plantae
- Clade: Tracheophytes
- Clade: Gymnosperms
- Division: Pinophyta
- Class: Pinopsida
- Order: Araucariales
- Family: Podocarpaceae
- Genus: Lepidothamnus
- Species: L. intermedius

Binomial name
- Lepidothamnus intermedius (Kirk) Quinn

Synonyms
- Dacrydium intermedium Kirk; Dacrydium intermedium var. gracile Kirk

= Lepidothamnus intermedius =

Species of conifer

Lepidothamnus intermedius, commonly known as the yellow silver pine, is a species of conifer in the family Podocarpaceae. It is a tree endemic to New Zealand.

== Description ==
It is a dioecious tree that reaches 15 m in height. The trunk is often multi-trunked with a diameter of 0.3–0.6 m and the bark is grey-brown. Foliage is usually bright yellow-green but can also be brown.

== Distribution ==
This species is found in the North Island and in western parts of the South Island and Stewart Island.
