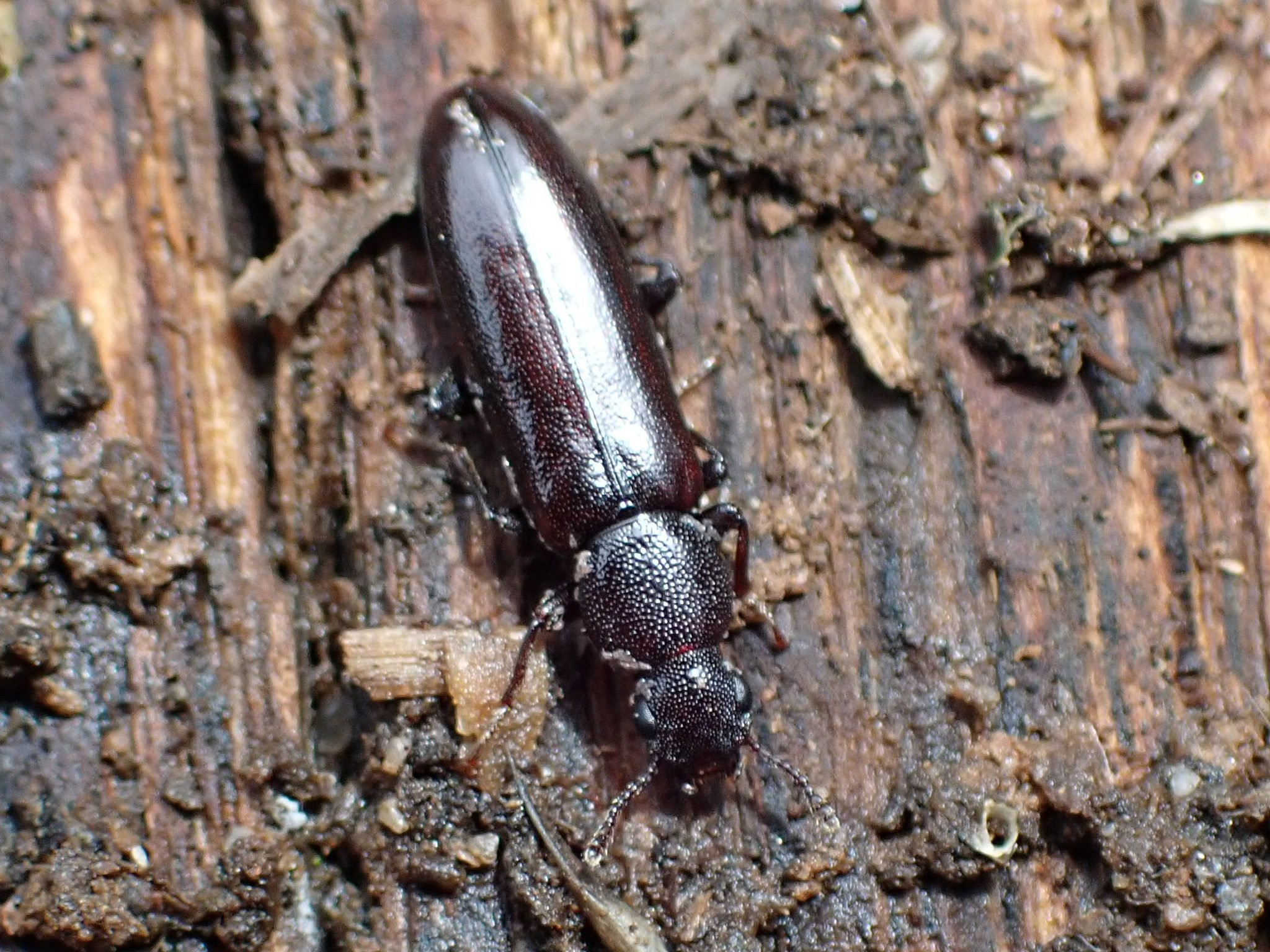

Scientific classification
- Kingdom: Animalia
- Phylum: Arthropoda
- Class: Insecta
- Order: Coleoptera
- Suborder: Polyphaga
- Infraorder: Cucujiformia
- Family: Boridae
- Genus: Boros
- Species: B. unicolor

Binomial name
- Boros unicolor Say, 1827

= Boros unicolor =

Species of beetle

Boros unicolor is a species of conifer bark beetle in the family Boridae. It is found in North America.
