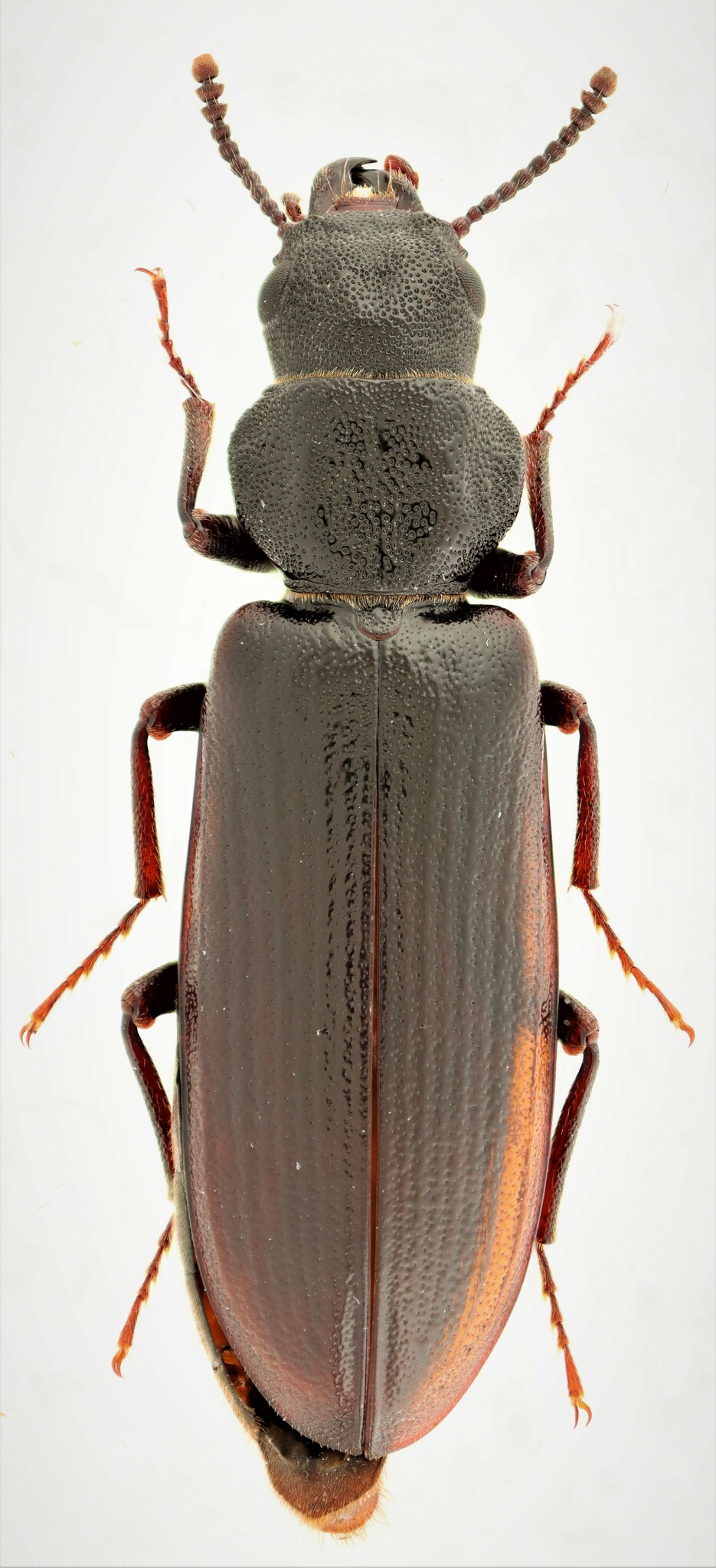
- Lecontia discicollis

Scientific classification
- Kingdom: Animalia
- Phylum: Arthropoda
- Class: Insecta
- Order: Coleoptera
- Suborder: Polyphaga
- Infraorder: Cucujiformia
- Family: Boridae
- Genus: Lecontia; Champion, 1893
- Species: L. discicollis

Binomial name
- Lecontia discicollis (LeConte, 1850)

Synonyms
- Crymodes LeConte, 1850 (Preocc.)

= Lecontia =

Genus of beetles

Lecontia is a genus of conifer bark beetles in the family Boridae, containing the single species, Lecontia discicollis (LeConte, 1850). It is found in Central America and North America.

Lecontia discicollis is 12-23mm in length and mainly lives under the bark of dead conifers. Its diet is unknown.
