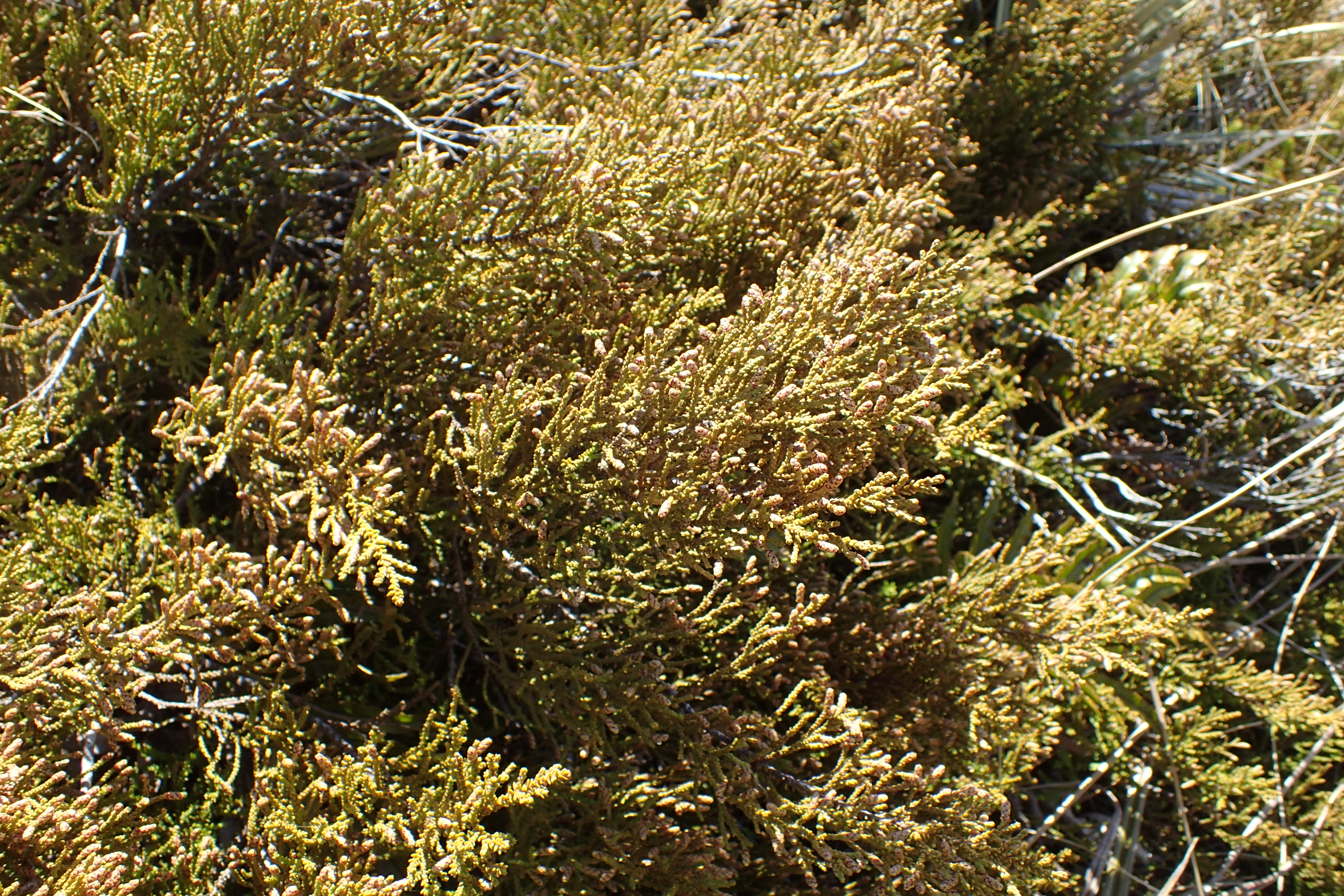

Conservation status
- Least Concern (IUCN 3.1)

Scientific classification
- Kingdom: Plantae
- Clade: Tracheophytes
- Clade: Gymnosperms
- Division: Pinophyta
- Class: Pinopsida
- Order: Araucariales
- Family: Podocarpaceae
- Genus: Lepidothamnus
- Species: L. laxifolius

Binomial name
- Lepidothamnus laxifolius (Hook.f.) Quinn

Synonyms
- Dacrydium laxifolium Hook.f.; Dacrydium laxifolium var. compactum Kirk; Dacrydium laxifolium var. debile Kirk

= Lepidothamnus laxifolius =

Species of conifer

Lepidothamnus laxifolius, commonly known as the pygmy pine or mountain rimu, is a species of conifer in the family Podocarpaceae. It is endemic to New Zealand, where it is found in the North Island, the South Island and on Stewart Island.

== Distribution ==
Lepidothamnus laxifolius is a high alpine specialist found in high-elevation bog communities and in scrub, often in association with Halocarpus bidwillii and Podocarpus nivalis. Example locations include Tongariro National Park and Arthur's Pass. On Stewart Island it is found in lowland as well as in montane areas.

== Description ==
It has a scrambling prostrate habit and plants as little as 8 cm in height have been observed in fruit. Branches may be up to 5 mm in diameter and up to 1 metre long. Its cones are red and fleshy, and borne terminally on the horizontal branches. The seed is dark brown on red fleshy scales. It is believed to be the smallest conifer in the world and is rarely bigger than a small low-growing shrub.

== Taxonomy ==
The genus Lepidothamnus was once part of Dacrydium in the classification by Bentham and Hooker in 1880. However, current taxonomy separates it as a distinct genus with three species, one endemic to southern Chile and the other two in New Zealand. All three species have a distinctive cone morphology not shared with other podocarps with its erect ovule, as well as the absence of resin ducts in the leaves. These three species also synthesise cupressuflavone as their major biflavonoid – a feature not found in other podocarps. They have narrow, linear spreading juvenile leaves that gradually change into more strongly keeled and appressed scales. Female cones are borne singly and at the ends of branches and each has 3–5 bracts with very elongated bases. Each fertile bracts supports an erect ovule in its axil and this ovule remains erect throughout its development.
