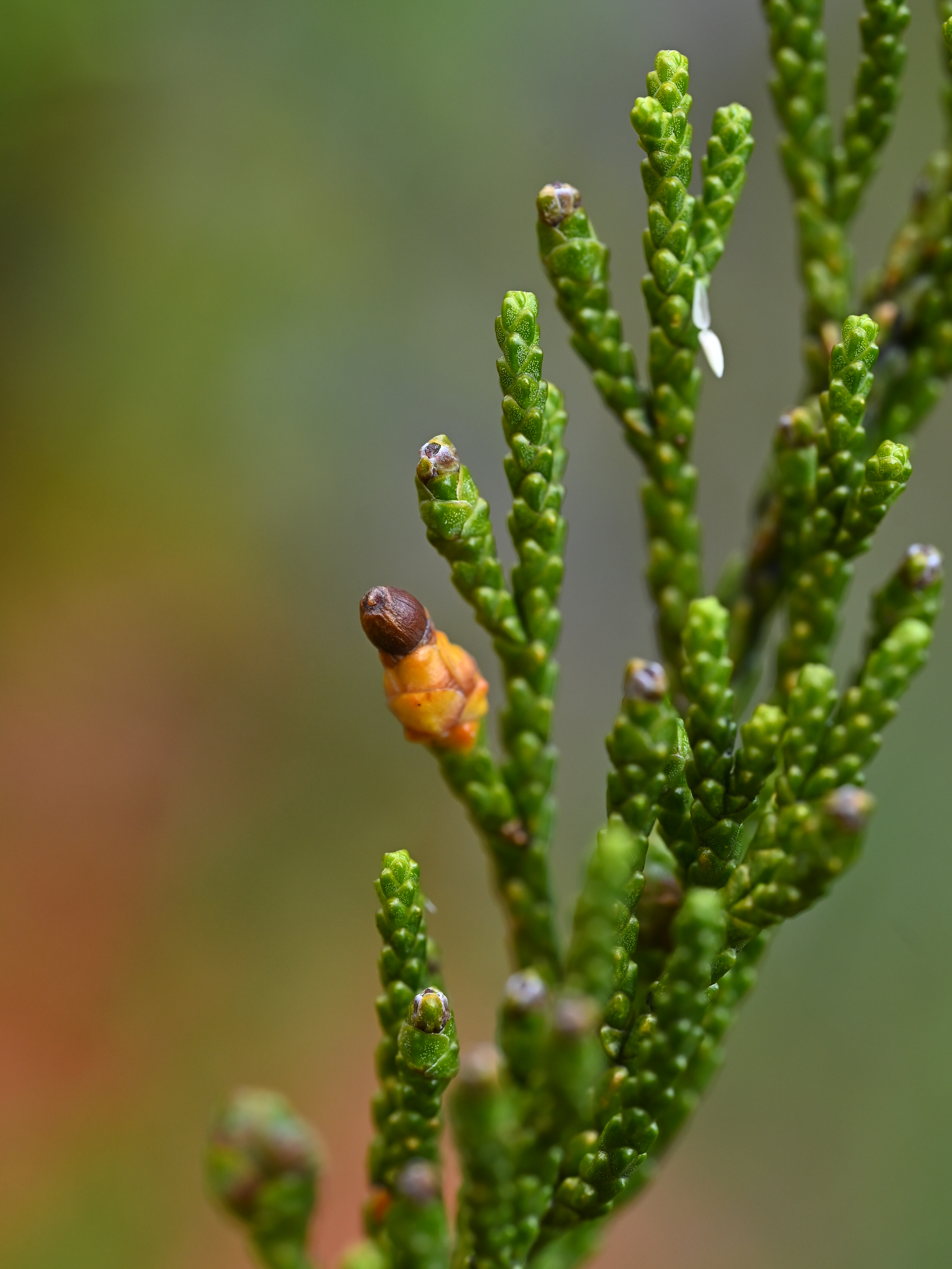

Conservation status
- Least Concern (IUCN 3.1)

Scientific classification
- Kingdom: Plantae
- Clade: Tracheophytes
- Clade: Gymnosperms
- Division: Pinophyta
- Class: Pinopsida
- Order: Araucariales
- Family: Podocarpaceae
- Genus: Lepidothamnus
- Species: L. fonkii

Binomial name
- Lepidothamnus fonkii Phil.

Synonyms
- Dacrydium fonkii (Phil.) Ball

= Lepidothamnus fonkii =

Species of conifer

Lepidothamnus fonkii (Spanish: ciprés enano) is a species of conifer in the family Podocarpaceae. It is a subshrub native to southwestern Argentina and southern Chile. It is threatened by habitat loss.
