= Archaeorrhynchus =

Archaeorrhynchus Temporal range: Callovian–Oxfordian

Scientific classification
- Kingdom: Animalia
- Phylum: Arthropoda
- Class: Insecta
- Order: Coleoptera
- Suborder: Polyphaga
- Infraorder: Cucujiformia
- Family: Nemonychidae
- Genus: †Archaeorrhynchus

Type species
- †Archaeorrhynchus tenuicornis Martynov, 1926

Species
- †A. tenuicornis Martynov, 1926; †A. acutirostris Arnoldi, 1977; †A. carpenteri Legalov, 2014

Extinct genus of beetles

Archaeorrhynchus is an extinct genus of weevil from the family Nemonychidae. It is known from the Callovian-Oxfordian Karabastau Formation in Kazakhstan. The type species, Archaeorrhynchus tenuicornis, was named in 1926. Two other species, A. tenuicornis and A. carpenteri, were described from the same locality.
