= Lecontella =

Scientific classification
- Domain: Eukaryota
- Kingdom: Animalia
- Phylum: Arthropoda
- Class: Insecta
- Order: Coleoptera
- Suborder: Polyphaga
- Infraorder: Cucujiformia
- Family: Cleridae
- Subfamily: Tillinae
- Genus: Lecontella; Wolcott & Chapin, 1918

Genus of beetles

Lecontella is a genus of checkered beetles in the family Cleridae. There are at least four described species in Lecontella.

== Species ==
These four species belong to the genus Lecontella:

- Lecontella brunnea (Spinola, 1844).
- Lecontella cancellata (LeConte, 1854).
- Lecontella gnara Wolcott, 1927.
- Lecontella striatopunctata Chevrolat, 1876.
