= John Lawrence LeConte =

American entomologist (1825–1883)

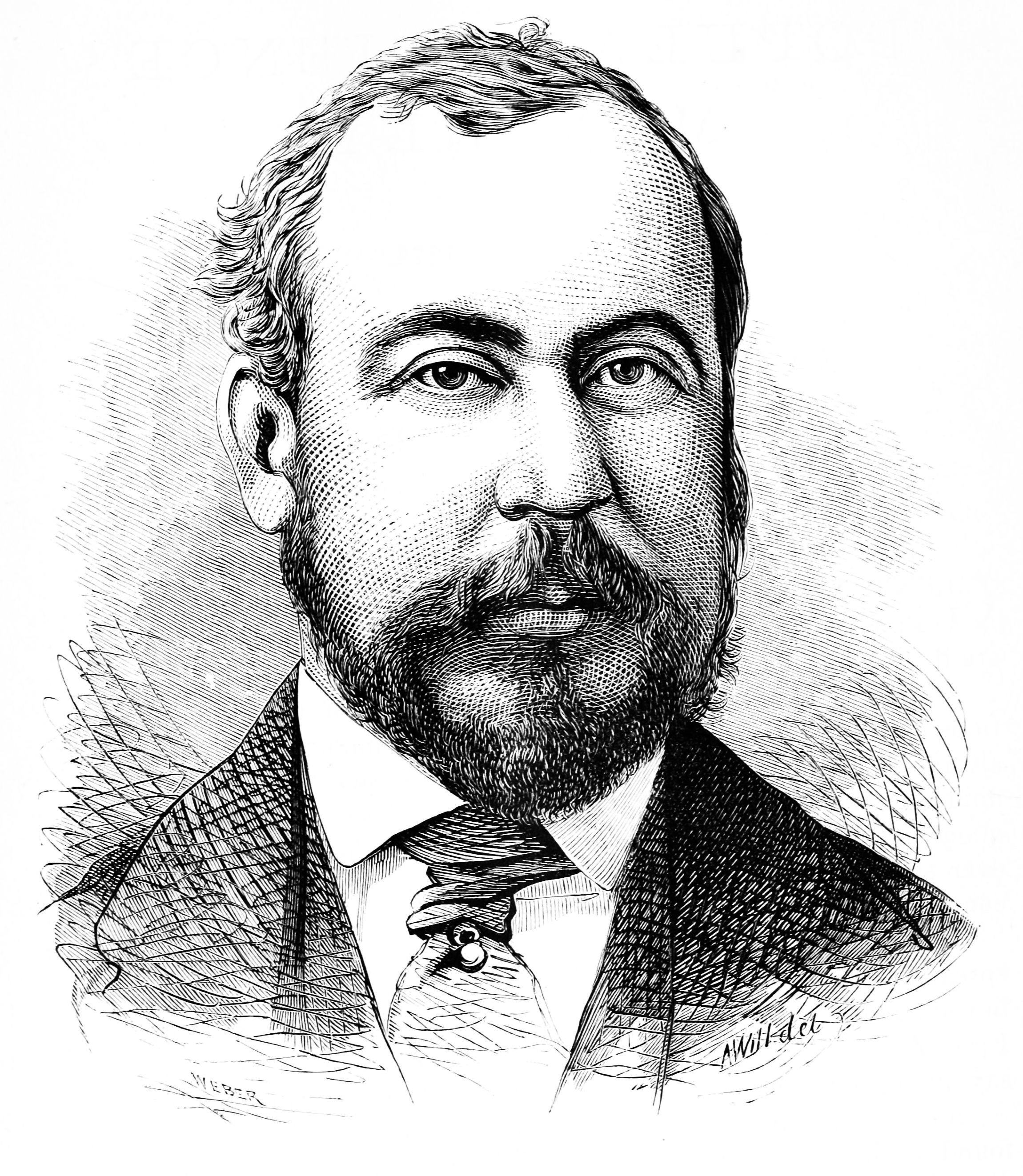
- Born: May 13, 1825; New York, New York, U.S.
- Died: November 15, 1883 (aged 58); Philadelphia, Pennsylvania, U.S.
- Burial place: West Laurel Hill Cemetery, Bala Cynwyd, Pennsylvania, U.S.
- Education: Mount St. Mary's University; College of Physicians and Surgeons
- Scientific career
- Fields: Entomology
- Workplaces: American Philosophical Society; American Association for the Advancement of Science; National Academy of Sciences

John Lawrence LeConte (May 13, 1825 – November 15, 1883) was an American entomologist and a pioneer in the classification of North American beetles. His Catalogue of Coleoptera of the United States was published by the Smithsonian Institution in 1853 and was the first organized study of beetles in the United States. He described approximately 5,000 species of beetles and was known as "the father of American beetle study".

He was Chief Clerk of the United States Mint in Philadelphia from 1878 to 1883. He was a founding member of the American Entomological Society, a charter member of the National Academy of Sciences, and president of the American Association for the Advancement of Science in 1874. Hundreds of beetles, several birds, and a mineral were named in his honor.

== Early life and education ==
LeConte was born May 13, 1825, in New York City, to naturalist John Eatton Le Conte and Mary A. H. Lawrence. The family was wealthy from business in the sugar trade in Martinique and a family plantation in Liberty County, Georgia. His mother died when he was only a few months old, and he was raised by his father.

He graduated from Mount Saint Mary College in 1842, and received his medical degree from the College of Physicians and Surgeons of New York, in 1846.

While still in medical college, in 1844, LeConte traveled with his cousin Joseph LeConte to the Great Lakes to study the geology of the region.

== Career ==
He worked as a chemical assistant to John Torrey and briefly practiced medicine. He published his first paper on beetles in 1844. He was a proponent of American entomologists being used to describe insects in the United States. He disagreed with the practice of specimens being sent to Europe for entomologists there to describe them. In 1845 he declared "America's Entomological Declaration of Independence".

In 1846, he collected insects in the Mississippi Valley from St. Louis to Minnesota. From 1847 to 1948, Hermann Rudolph Schaum visited the United States and stayed in the LeConte home. He mentored LeConte and provided advice on his study of beetles. LeConte also had a long term correspondence with other European entomologists including Jean Théodore Lacordaire and Carl Robert Osten-Sacken.

In 1849 he traveled to California via Panama and spent the next year and a half collecting specimens from the areas around San Francisco, San Diego, and the Gila River in Arizona. While in San Francisco, he sent 10,000 beetles preserved in ethanol back to his father. Another 20,000 beetle specimens were lost in a fire in 1852. He traveled several times to the Lake Superior region including once with Louis Agassiz to help with his research.

He moved to Philadelphia in 1852 and began work on the classification of Coleoptera and Cerambycinae in North America. He partnered with Samuel Haldeman and revised Catalogue of Coleoptera of the United States by Frederick Ernst Melsheimer. The catalog was published by the Smithsonian Institution in 1853 and was the first organized study of beetles in the United States. In 1857, he participated in the Honduras interoceanic survey led by John C. Trautwine.

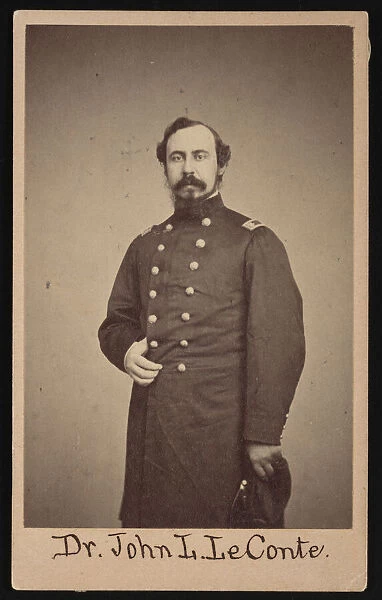
LeConte in army uniform

His study of entolomology was disrupted during the American Civil War. He was appointed to the United States Sanitary Commission in 1862 and enlisted to serve as a medical inspector and surgeon in the Army of the Potomac. He was promoted to the rank of lieutenant colonel. He was mustered out of the United States Army on October 31, 1865.

In 1867, he joined the Union Pacific Railway survey team as a naturalist along with Charles Christopher Parry. He spent two years exploring the Colorado River and in Colorado and New Mexico during the survey for the Kansas Pacific Railroad.

From 1869 to 1872, he lived in Europe with his family. He continued his entomological studies in Europe and also visited Algiers and Egypt.

In 1877, he had a failed candidacy as Commissioner of Agriculture under President Rutherford B. Hayes. In 1878 he became the Chief Clerk of the United States Mint in Philadelphia and worked in that role until 1883.

He published 184 papers on entomology over the course of his life, many of them in the Proceedings of the Academy of Natural Sciences of Philadelphia. LeConte communicated with and collected birds and other natural history specimens for Spencer Fullerton Baird, a distant relative associated with the Smithsonian Institution. In return, Baird asked other naturalists to collect beetles for LeConte. He received insect specimens from several entomologists and naturalists including James Graham Cooper, Henry Edwards, George Gibbs, Simon S. Rathvon, George Suckley, and John Xantus.

LeConte was a member of the Academy of Natural Sciences of Philadelphia, the American Philosophical Society, and president of the American Association for the Advancement of Science in 1874. In 1859, he was a founding member of the American Entomological Society, and a charter member of the National Academy of Sciences.

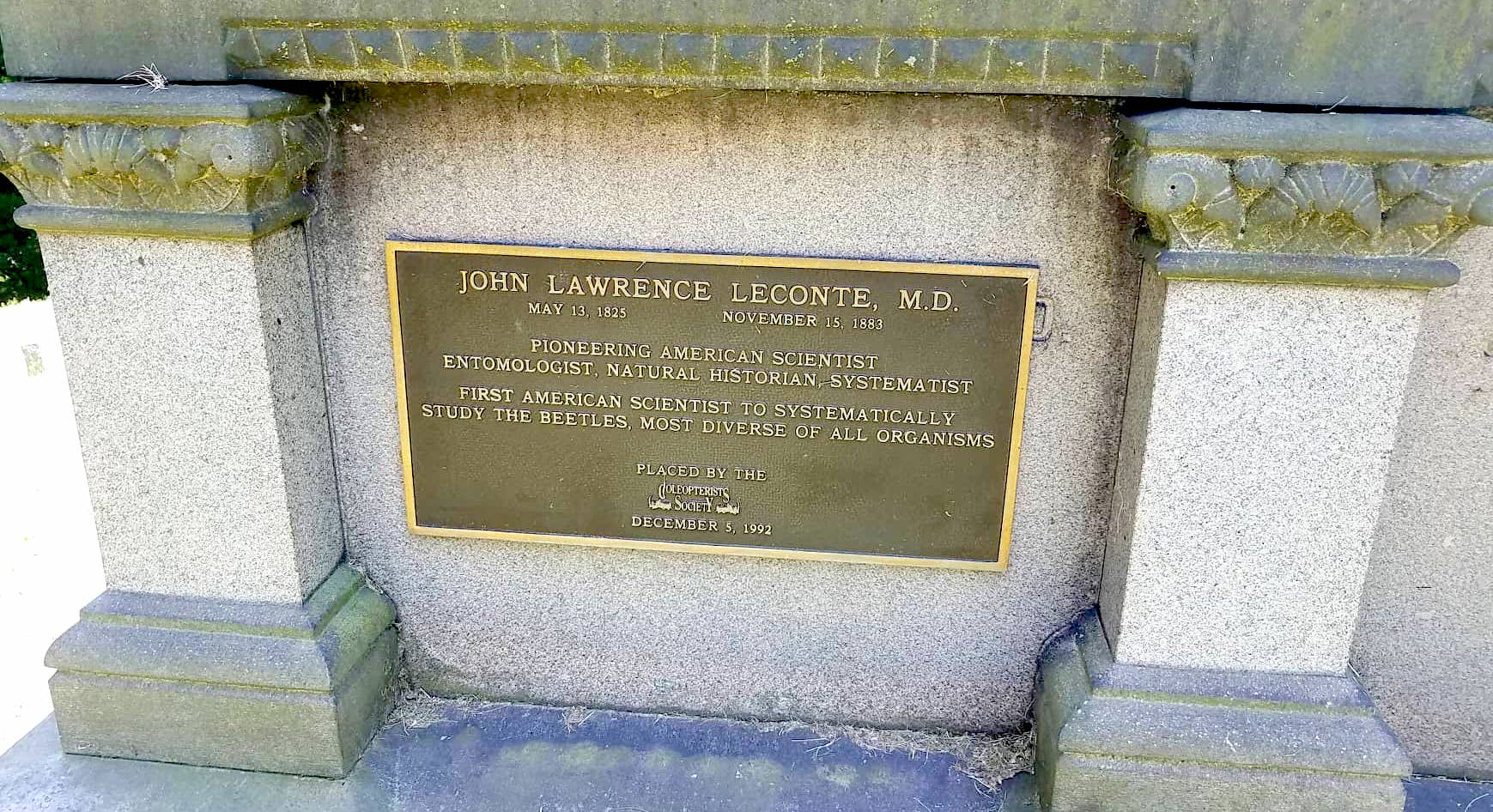
LeConte's gravestone in West Laurel Hill Cemetery

Afer suffering a stroke, he died in Philadelphia on November 15, 1883. He was interred at West Laurel Hill Cemetery in Bala Cynwyd, Pennsylvania.

== Personal life ==
In 1861, he married Helen S. Grier, the daughter of Supreme Court Judge Robert Cooper Grier. They had three children although one died as an infant.

== Legacy ==
The genera Lecontella, Lecontellus, Lecontia, and Contia and several hundred species (mostly beetles) are named after him. Several birds, including LeConte's thrasher (Toxostoma lecontei), which he collected in Fort Yuma, Arizona, were named after him.

In the 1850s, LeConte collected some crystals from a cave in Honduras being mined for bat guano. It was later found to be a new mineral that was named Lecontite in his honor.

His collection of beetles are held at the Museum of Comparative Zoology at Harvard University.

== Works ==
- Melsheimer, F.E.; Haldeman (rev.), S.S.; LeConte (rev.), J.L. (1853). Catalogue of the Described Coleoptera of the United States. Washington: Smithsonian Institution.
- Catalogue of the Coleoptera of the United States. (1853) Frederick Ernst Melsheimer, revised by Samuel Stehman Haldeman and John Lawrence LeConte
- Classification of the Coleoptera of North America (1861, 1873)
- New Species of North American Coleoptera (1866, 1873)
- LeConte, John; Horn, George H. (December 1876). "The Rhynchophora of America, North of Mexico". Proceedings of the American Philosophical Society. 15 (96): iii–xvi, 1–455.
- Classification of the Coleoptera of North America. Part II (1883) - with George Henry Horn

== Taxa described by him ==
- See Category:Taxa named by John Lawrence LeConte

== Sources ==
- Dow, R. P. (1914). "The Greatest Coleopterist". Journal of the New York Entomological Society. 22 (3): 185–191. JSTOR 25003617.
- Essig, E. O. (1931). A History of Entomology. MacMillan Company. pp. 680–685.
- Horn, George H. (1883). "John Lawrence LeConte". Science. 2 (46): 783–786. Bibcode:1883Sci.....2..783H. doi:10.1126/science.ns-2.46.783. PMID 17739760.
- Mallis, Arnold (1971). American Entomologists. Rutgers University Press. pp. 242–248. ISBN 9780813506869.
- Riley, Charles Valentine (1883). "Tribute to the Memory of John Lawrence LeConte". Psyche: A Journal of Entomology. 4 (115–116): 107–110. doi:10.1155/1883/37519.
- Scudder, Samuel H. (1884). "Dr. John Lawrence LeConte, A Memoir Read to the National Academy of Science" (PDF). Transactions of the National Entomological Society. National Academy of Sciences.
- Sorensen, W. Conner (1995). Brethren of the Net, American Entomology, 1840-1880. University of Alabama Press.
