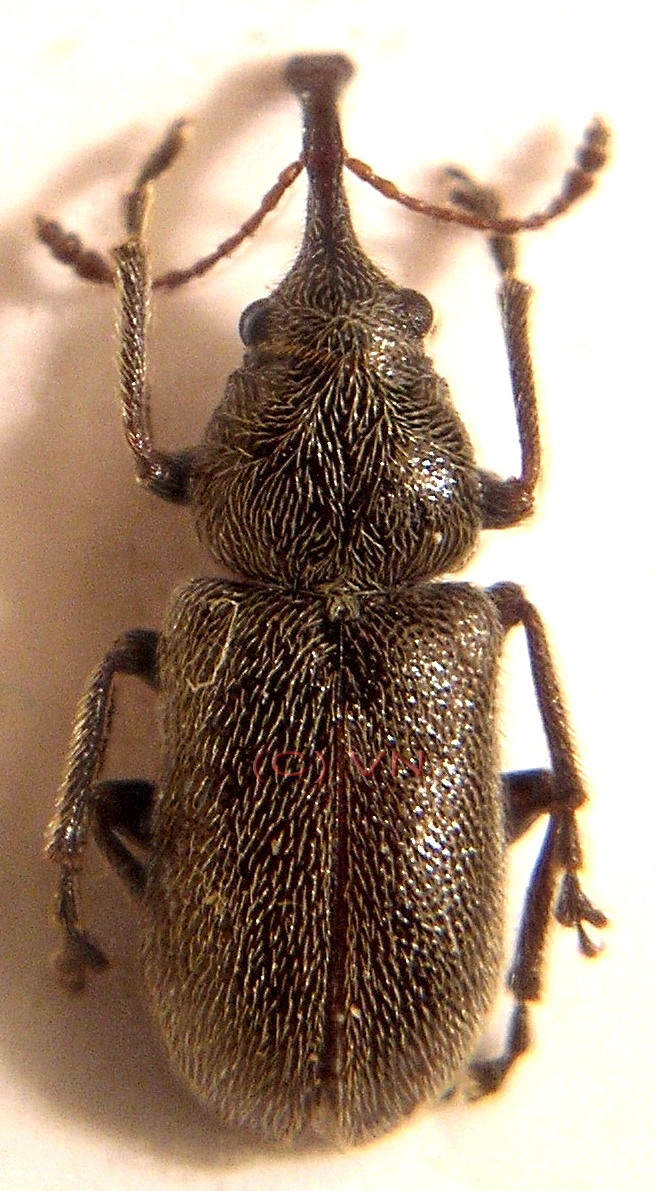
- Doydirhynchus austriacus

Scientific classification
- Kingdom: Animalia
- Phylum: Arthropoda
- Clade: Pancrustacea
- Class: Insecta
- Order: Coleoptera
- Suborder: Polyphaga
- Infraorder: Cucujiformia
- Clade: Phytophaga
- Superfamily: Curculionoidea
- Family: Nemonychidae; Bedel, 1882

Subfamilies
- Cimberidinae (but see text); Nemonychinae; Rhinorhynchinae

Synonyms
- Cimberididae Gozis, 1882; Cimberidae Auctt. (missp.)

= Nemonychidae =

Nemonychidae Temporal range: Oxfordian-Present

Family of beetles

Nemonychidae is a small family of weevils, placed within the primitive weevil group because they have straight rather than geniculate (elbowed) antennae. They are often called pine flower weevils. As in the Anthribidae, the labrum appears as a separate segment to the clypeus, and the maxillary palps are long and projecting. Nemonychidae have all ventrites free, while Anthribidae have ventrites 1-4 connate or partially fused. Nemonychidae lack lateral carinae on the pronotum, while these are usually present, though may be short, in Anthribidae.

Nemonychidae are historically divided into three subfamilies: Nemonychinae of the Palearctic region with the single genus Nemonyx and an unusual host, the angiosperm Delphinium. Most species of the other two subfamilies are associated with conifers, feeding on the pollen of the male inflorescences. Cimberidinae are found in the Northern hemisphere, while Rhinorhynchinae occur largely in the Southern hemisphere, especially found on Podocarpaceae and Araucariaceae. Recent phylogenetic research indicates that the Cimberidinae are sister to all of the remaining Curculionoidea, and it has been proposed to elevate the group to family rank.

Both Nemonychidae adults and larvae feed primarily on pollen. When mature, the larvae will drop to the ground from the male cones or flowers they resided in to pupate in the soil less than five centimeters from the surface.

There exists a fairly extensive fossil record of Nemonychidae reaching from the upper Jurassic to tertiary amber.

== Extant taxa ==
Cimberidinae:

- Acromacer
- Cimberis
- Doydirhynchus
- Lecontellus
- Pityomacer

Nemonychinae:

- Nemonyx

Rhinorhynchinae:

- Aragomacer
- Araucomacer
- Atopomacer
- Basiliogeus
- Basiliorhinus
- Brarus
- Bunyaeus
- Eutactobius
- Idiomacer
- Mecomacer
- Nannomacer
- Notomacer
- Pagomacer
- Rhinorhynchus
- Rhynchitomacer
- Rhynchitomacerinus
- Rhynchitoplesius
- Stenomacer
- Zimmiellus

== Extinct taxa ==
- †Kuschelomacer
- †subfamily Brenthorrhininae Arnoldi 1977
  - †tribe Brenthorrhinini Arnoldi 1977
    - †subtribe Brenthorrhinina Arnoldi 1977
      - †Abrenthorrhinus Legalov 2009 Karabastau Formation, Kazakhstan, Middle-Late Jurassic (Callovian/Oxfordian)
      - †Brenthorrhinus Arnoldi 1977 Karabastau Formation, Kazakhstan, Callovian/Oxfordian
      - †Gobibrenthorrhinus Gratshev and Legalov 2009 Ulugei Formation, Mongolia, Late Jurassic (Tithonian)
    - †subtribe Brenthorrhinoidina Legalov 2003
      - †Brenthorrhinoides Gratshev and Zherikhin 1995 Karabastau Formation, Kazakhstan, Callovian/Oxfordian
  - †tribe Distenorrhinini Arnoldi 1977
    - †Buryatnemonyx Legalov 2010 Khasurty locality, Russia, Early Cretaceous (Aptian)
    - †Distenorrhinus Arnoldi 1977 Karabastau Formation, Kazakhstan, Callovian/Oxfordian, La Pedrera de Rúbies Formation, Las Hoyas, Spain, Early Cretaceous (Barremian) Khasurty locality, Russia, Aptian
    - †Megabrenthorrhinus Gratshev and Zherikhin 1995 Karabastau Formation, Kazakhstan, Callovian/Oxfordian
    - †Microbrenthorrhinus Gratshev and Zherikhin 2000 La Pedrera de Rúbies Formation, Spain, Barremian
    - †Talbragarus Oberprieler and Oberprieler 2012 Talbragar Fossil bed, Australia, Tithonian
  - †tribe Eccoptarthrini Arnoldi 1977
    - †Astenorrhinus Gratshev and Zherikhin 1995 Karabastau Formation, Kazakhstan, Callovian/Oxfordian
    - †Cratonemonyx Legalov 2014 Crato Formation, Brazil, Aptian
    - †Eccoptarthrus Arnoldi 1977 Karabastau Formation, Kazakhstan, Callovian/Oxfordian
    - †Procurculio Arnoldi 1977 Karabastau Formation, Kazakhstan, Callovian/Oxfordian
- †subfamily Cretonemonychinae Gratshev and Legalov 2009
  - †tribe Cretonemonychini Gratshev and Legalov 2009
    - †Cretonemonyx Gratshev and Legalov 2009 Zaza Formation, Russia, Aptian
    - †Pseudonemonyx Gratshev and Legalov 2009 Zaza Formation, Russia, Aptian
    - †Turononemonyx Legalov 2014 Kzyl-Zhar, Kazakhstan, Late Cretaceous )Turonian)
  - †tribe Eocaenonemonychini Legalov 2013
    - †Eocaenonemonyx Legalov 2013 Green River Formation, United States, Eocene
    - †"Eugnamptus" decemsatus Scudder 1878 Green River Formation, United States, Eocene
    - †"Sitona" grandaevus Scudder 1876 Green River Formation, United States, Eocene
- †subfamily Eobelinae Arnoldi 1977
  - †tribe Eobelini Arnoldi 1977
    - †Archaeorrhynchoides Legalov 2009 Karabastau Formation, Kazakhstan, Callovian/Oxfordian
    - †Archaeorrhynchus Martynov 1926 Karabastau Formation, Kazakhstan, Callovian/Oxfordian
    - †Eobelus Arnoldi 1977 Karabastau Formation, Kazakhstan, Callovian/Oxfordian
    - †Martynovirhynchus Legalov 2010 Karabastau Formation, Kazakhstan, Callovian/Oxfordian
  - †tribe Karataucarini Legalov 2009
    - †Ampliceps Arnoldi 1977 Karabastau Formation, Kazakhstan, Callovian/Oxfordian
  - †tribe Oxycorynoidini Arnoldi 1977
    - †Oxycorynoides Arnoldi 1977 Karabastau Formation, Kazakhstan, Callovian/Oxfordian Weald Clay, United Kingdom, Barremian Gurvan-Eren Formation, Mongolia, Aptian
    - †Microprobelus Liu et al. 2006 Yixian Formation, China, Aptian
    - †Khetoxycorynoides Legalov 2011 Emanra Formation, Russia, Turonian
    - †Cratomacer Zherikhin and Gratshev 2004 Crato Formation, Brazil, Aptian
  - †tribe Probelini Legalov 2009
    - †Belonotaris Arnoldi 1977 Karabastau Formation, Kazakhstan, Callovian/Oxfordian
    - †Probelus Arnoldi 1977 Karabastau Formation, Kazakhstan, Callovian/Oxfordian
  - Incertae sedis
    - †Longidorsum Zhang 1997 Dalazi Formation, China, Aptian
- †subfamily Paleocartinae Legalov 2003
  - †tribe Metrioxenoidini Legalov 2009
    - †Brasilnemonyx Legalov 2009 Crato Formation, Brazil, Aptian
    - †Cretoxenoides Legalov 2010 Huhtyk Formation, Mongolia, Early Cretaceous (Hauterivian)
    - †Khetanamonyx Legalov 2009 Emanra Formation, Russia, Turonian
    - †Megametrioxenoides Gratshev and Legalov 2009 Tsagaantsav Formation, Mongolia, Early Cretaceous (Valanginian)
    - †Metrioxenoides Gratshev et al. 1998 Lulworth Formation, United Kingdom,Early Cretaceous ( Berriasian)
  - †tribe Paleocartini Legalov 2003
    - †subtribe Nebrenthorrhinina Legalov 2007
      - †Nebrenthorrhinus Legalov 2003 La Pedrera de Rúbies Formation, Spain, Barremian
    - †subtribe Paleocartina Legalov 2003
      - †Paleocartus Legalov 2003 Karabastau Formation, Kazakhstan, Callovian/Oxfordian
  - †tribe Selengarhynchini Gratshev and Legalov 2009
    - †Selengarhynchoides Legalov 2010 Sharin-Gol Formation, Mongolia, Barremian
    - †Selengarhynchus Gratshev and Legalov 2009 Sharin-Gol Formation, Mongolia, Barremian
- Subfamily Rhinorhynchinae Voss 1922
  - Tribe Mecomacerini Kuschel 1994
    - †Burmomacer Legalov 2018 Burmese amber, Myanmar, Late Cretaceous (Cenomanian)
    - †Burmonyx Davis and Engel 2014 Burmese amber, Myanmar, Cenomanian
    - †Guillermorhinus Clarke and Oberprieler 2018 Burmese amber, Myanmar, Cenomanian
    - †Renicimberis Legalov 2009 Yixian Formation, China, Aptian
