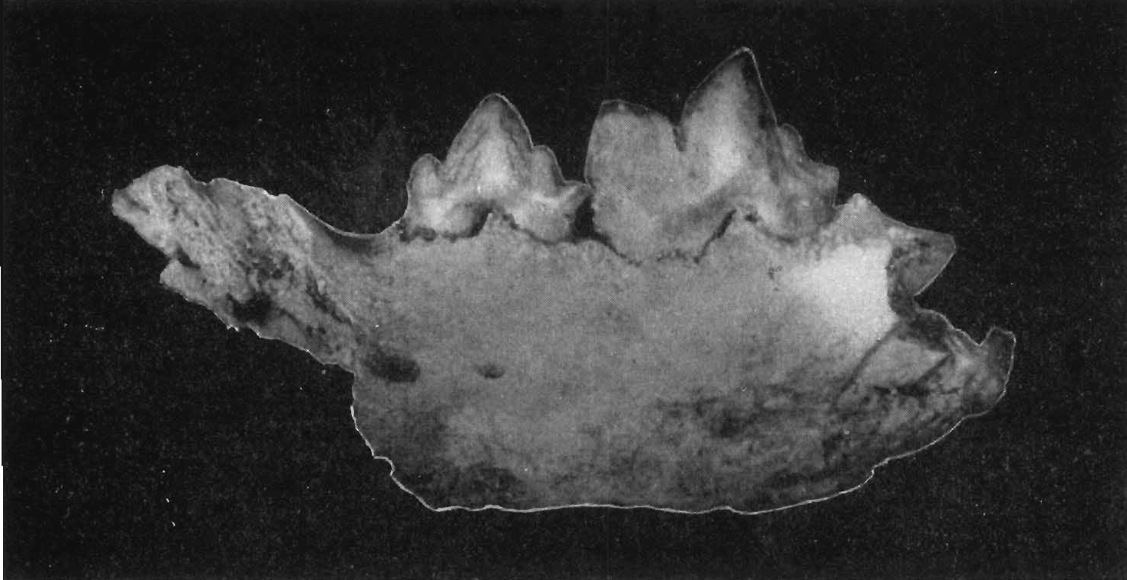
- Picture of the holotype of F. wenzensis from Stach, 1961.

Scientific classification
- Domain: Eukaryota
- Kingdom: Animalia
- Phylum: Chordata
- Class: Mammalia
- Order: Carnivora
- Suborder: Feliformia
- Family: Felidae
- Subfamily: Felinae
- Genus: Felis
- Species: †F. wenzensis

Binomial name
- †Felis wenzensis Stach, 1961
- Map showing the location of the Węże locality in Poland.

= Felis wenzensis =

Felis wenzensis Temporal range: Pliocene (late Ruscinian)

Extinct species of felid

Felis wenzensis is an extinct species of cat that was described based on fossils from the Pliocene-aged Węże 1 locality in Poland. It is known from only one specimen, a partial left mandibular ramus, and is distinguished from the closely related felines Felis lunensis and Felis silvestris (the modern European wildcat) by its larger teeth.

== History and naming ==
The holotype fossil was collected from the Węże locality, from the northern end of the Kraków-Wieluń Upland in Poland. It was described as the new species Felis wenzensis by paleontologist Jan Stach in 1961. The species name wenzensis means "from Węże".

Another set of fossils from the late Early Pleistocene site of Somssich Hill 2 in Hungary were described as similar in size to Felis wenzensis, but were assigned to Felis cf. lunensis due to their younger age.

== Description ==
The holotype and only specimen is the front part of a partial left mandibular ramus, with the third and fourth premolars intact, but missing the canine tooth and incisors. Part of the tooth socket of the canine is present, allowing the diastema to be measured. The first and second premolars were entirely absent, and the third and fourth premolars were present and intact.

F. wenzensis was similar in size to the modern European wildcat. It is differentiated from that species by its shorter diastema, and from both the contemporary prehistoric feline Felis lunensis (which has a similarly short diastema) and the modern wildcat by its comparatively larger teeth.

== Classification ==
Stach considered F. wenzensis a close relative, if not just a northern variety, of Felis lunensis.

== Paleoecology ==
The Węże 1 locality is dated to the Pliocene (late Ruscinian, MN 15), some 4.2–3.4 million years ago. The climate at the locality is thought to have been mediterranean – relatively warm and arid – at that time, based on the presence of various reptiles such as turtles. A variety of small mammals are also recorded from the locality, including multiple species of shrews, hedgehogs, desmans, moles, mole-rats, at least five species of rodents, the lagomorph Hypolagus beremendensis, and the porcupine Hystrix primigenia. Larger mammals included the rhinoceros Dicerorhinus megarhinus and the deer Procapreolus wenzensis and Cervus warthae.

Besides Felis wenzensis, five other carnivorans are known from Węże 1: Baranogale helbingi, the bear Agriotherium intermedium, and the mustelids Martes wenzensis, Mustela plioermina, and Mustela pliocaenica. Most of these, including F. wenzensis, are only known from the Węże 1 site.
