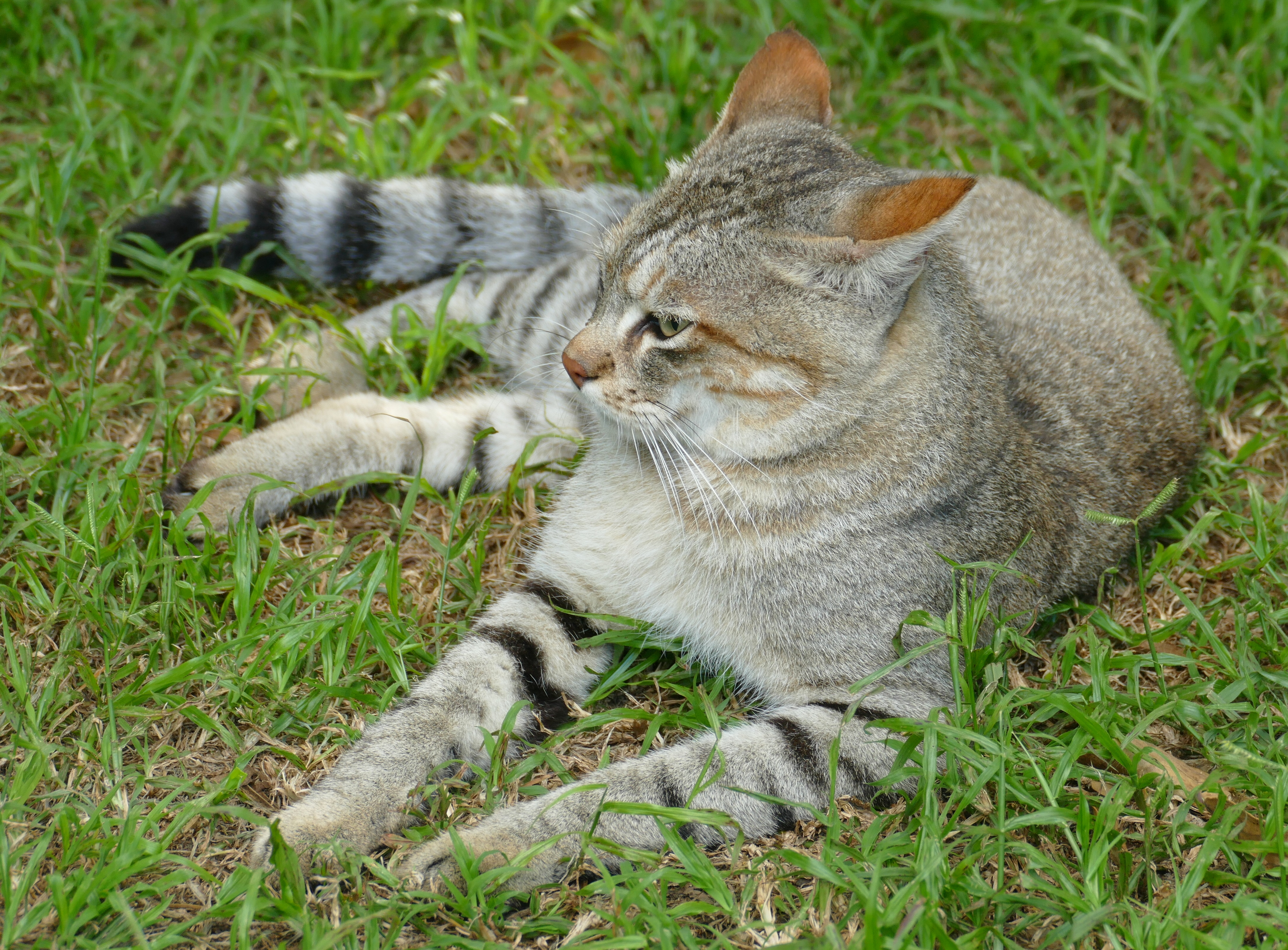
- A captive female Southern African wildcat

Conservation status
- Least Concern (IUCN 3.1)
- CITES Appendix II

Scientific classification
- Kingdom: Animalia
- Phylum: Chordata
- Class: Mammalia
- Infraclass: Placentalia
- Order: Carnivora
- Family: Felidae
- Genus: Felis
- Species: F. lybica

Binomial name
- Felis lybica Forster, 1780

Subspecies
- F. l. lybica Forster, 1780; F. l. cafra (Desmarest, 1822); F. l. ornata (Gray, 1830)
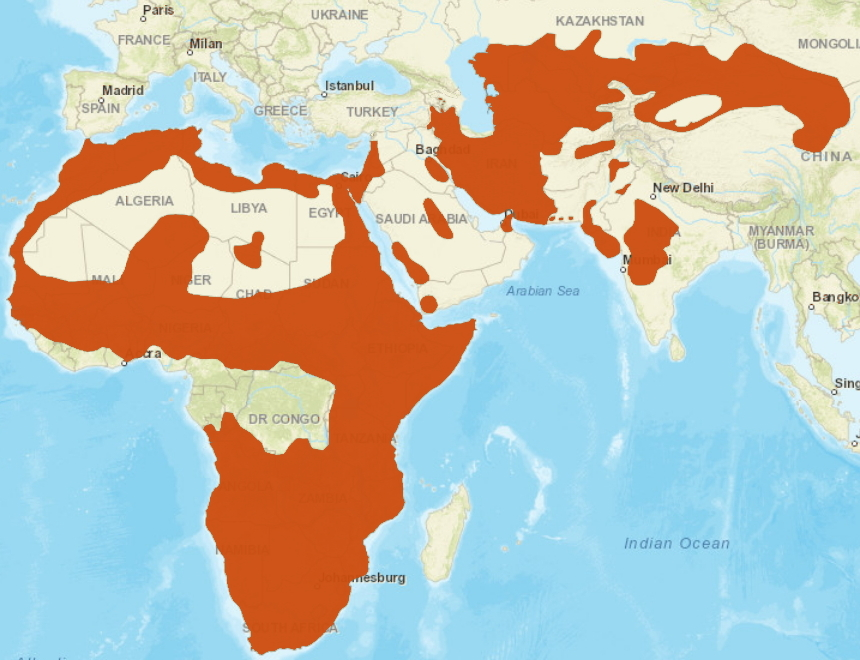
- native range as of 2015

= African wildcat =

African wildcat Temporal range: 131,000 years ago–present Middle Pleistocene to present

Small wild cat

The African wildcat (Felis lybica) is a small wildcat species with sandy grey fur, pale vertical stripes on the sides and around the face. It is native to Africa, West and Central Asia, and is distributed to Rajasthan in India and Xinjiang in China. It inhabits a broad variety of landscapes ranging from deserts to savannas, shrublands and grasslands.

The African wildcat is the ancestor of the domestic cat (F. catus). Some African wildcats were domesticated about 10,000 years ago in the Near East. Interspecific hybrids between both species are common where their ranges overlap.

== Taxonomy ==
Felis lybica was the scientific name proposed in 1780 by Georg Forster who based his description on a specimen from Gafsa on the Barbary Coast that had the size of a domestic cat, but a reddish fur, short black tufts on the ears, and a ringed tail. Between the late 18th and 20th centuries, several naturalists and curators of natural history museums described and proposed new names for wildcat holotypes from Africa and the Near East, including:

- Felis ocreata by Johann Friedrich Gmelin in 1791 was based on a description of a wildcat encountered in northern Ethiopia by James Bruce.
- Felis cafra by Anselme Gaëtan Desmarest in 1822 was based on two wildcat skins from South Africa's Eastern Cape.
- Felis ocreata mellandi by Harold Schwann in 1904 was based on two wildcat skins from northeastern Rhodesia in the collection of the Natural History Museum, London.
- Felis ocreata rubida also by Schwann in 1904 was a skull and a fulvous skin of a male wildcat from Belgian Congo.
- Felis ocreata ugandae also by Schwann in 1904 was a skull and a yellowish-grey skin of a male wildcat from Uganda.
- Felis ocreata mauritana by Ángel Cabrera in 1906 was a wildcat skin from the Mogador area in Morocco.
- Felis ocreata taitae by Edmund Heller in 1913 was a skull and a light-coloured skin of a female wildcat from Voi in southeastern Kenya.
- Felis ocreata iraki by Robert Ernest Cheesman in 1920 was a dove grey wildcat skin with salmon buff shading from Kuwait and another similar coloured specimen from the Tigris River.
- Felis haussa by Oldfield Thomas and Martin Hinton in 1921 was a skull and a sandy-coloured skin of a male wildcat from the Aïr Mountains south of Zinder.
- Felis ocreata griselda and F. o. namaquana by Oldfield Thomas in 1926 was a pale wildcat skin from south of Benguela in Angola and another pale wildcat skin from Namaqualand in Namibia.
- Felis lybica pyrrhus by Reginald Innes Pocock in 1944 was a series of ten greyish brown wildcat skins from Benguela.
- Felis lybica tristrami also by Pocock in 1944 was a pale buffy white skin of an adult female wildcat from the Palestinian Moab area.
- Felis lybica lowei, F. l. lynesi, F. l. foxi and F. l. brockmani also by Pocock in 1944 was a pale skin of an adult female wildcat from Marrah Mountains in the Darfur desert, a very pale skin of a male wildcat from north of Al-Fashir in Darfur, a dark skin of a male wildcat from Bauchi State in northern Nigeria, and a pale brown skin of a young adult male wildcat from the Golis Mountains in northern Somalia, respectively.
- Felis silvestris gordoni by David Harrison in 1968 was a skull and a very pale grey brown striped skin of a female wildcat from west of Sohar in Oman.

Since 2017, three African wildcat subspecies are recognised as valid taxa:

- F. l. lybica, the nominate subspecies in North Africa and Sinai to Sudan
- Southern African wildcat (F. l. cafra) in Southern Africa
- Asiatic wildcat (F. l. ornata) in Asia

=== Phylogeny ===
Phylogenetic analysis of the nuclear DNA in tissue samples from all Felidae species revealed that the evolutionary radiation of the Felidae began in Asia in the Miocene around 14.45 to 8.38 million years ago. Analysis of mitochondrial DNA of all Felidae species indicates a radiation at around 16.76 to 6.46 million years ago.

The African wildcat is part of an evolutionary lineage that is estimated to have genetically diverged from the common ancestor of the Felis species around 2.16 to 0.89 million years ago, based on analysis of their nuclear DNA. Analysis of their mitochondrial DNA indicates a genetic divergence from Felis at around 4.21 to 0.02 million years ago. Both models agree in the jungle cat (F. chaus) having been the first Felis species that diverged, followed by the black-footed cat (F. nigripes), the sand cat (F. margarita) and then the African wildcat.

The Asian and European wildcats descend from Felis lunensis, which inhabited Europe during the Pliocene and Pleistocene. Wildcat fossils are only found in Europe until the late Pleistocene, when an early form of the steppe-type wildcat appears to have diverged from the European population and quickly expanded into the Middle East, followed shortly after by secondary expansions into Southern Asia and the Middle East. Based on a mitochondrial DNA study of 979 domestic and wildcats from Europe, Asia, and Africa, the African wildcat is thought to have split off from the European wildcat about 173,000 years ago, with the North African/Near Eastern wildcat splitting from the Asiatic wildcat and the Southern African wildcat about 131,000 years ago.

About 10,000 years ago, some African wildcats were tamed in the Fertile Crescent, becoming the ancestors of the domestic cat. Domestic cats are derived from at least five "Mitochondrial Eves". African wildcats were also domesticated in ancient Egypt. The Egyptian domestic cat lineage started spreading in the Mediterranean Basin from the 8th century BCE onwards and arrived on the Baltic Sea coast by the 5th century CE.

In Cyprus, an African wildcat was found in a burial site next to a human skeleton in the Pre-Pottery Neolithic B settlement Shillourokambos. The graves are estimated to have been established by Neolithic farmers about 9,500 years ago, and are the earliest known evidence for a close association between a cat and a human. Their proximity indicates that the cat may have been tamed or domesticated. Results of genetic research indicate that the African wildcat genetically diverged into three clades about 173,000 years ago, namely the Near Eastern wildcat, Southern African wildcat and Asiatic wildcat. African wildcats were first domesticated about 10,000 years ago in the Near East, and are the ancestors of the domestic cat (F. catus). Molecular analysis of 87 cat samples from southern Europe revealed that specimens from Sardinia form a genetic cluster with African wildcat samples from northwestern Africa; the oldest cat in this cluster is dated about 2200 years ago and was found at an archaeological site near Genoni.

Domestic cats and African wildcats remain closely related in the present day; interspecific hybrids between domestic cat and African wildcats are common, and occur where their ranges overlap.

Phylogenetic relationships of the African wildcat as derived through analysis of

nuclear DNA:

- Felidae
  - Felinae
    - - - Felis
          - - - - - - Domestic cat (F. catus)
                    - European wildcat (F. silvestris)
                  - - African wildcat
                    - Chinese mountain cat (F. bieti)
                - Sand cat
              - Black-footed cat
            - Jungle cat
        - other Felinae lineages
  - Pantherinae

mitochondrial DNA:

- Felis
  - - - - - - African wildcat
              - - Domestic cat
                - Near Eastern wildcat
              - Asiatic wildcat
              - Southern African wildcat
          - European wildcat
        - Chinese mountain cat
      - Sand cat

== Characteristics ==
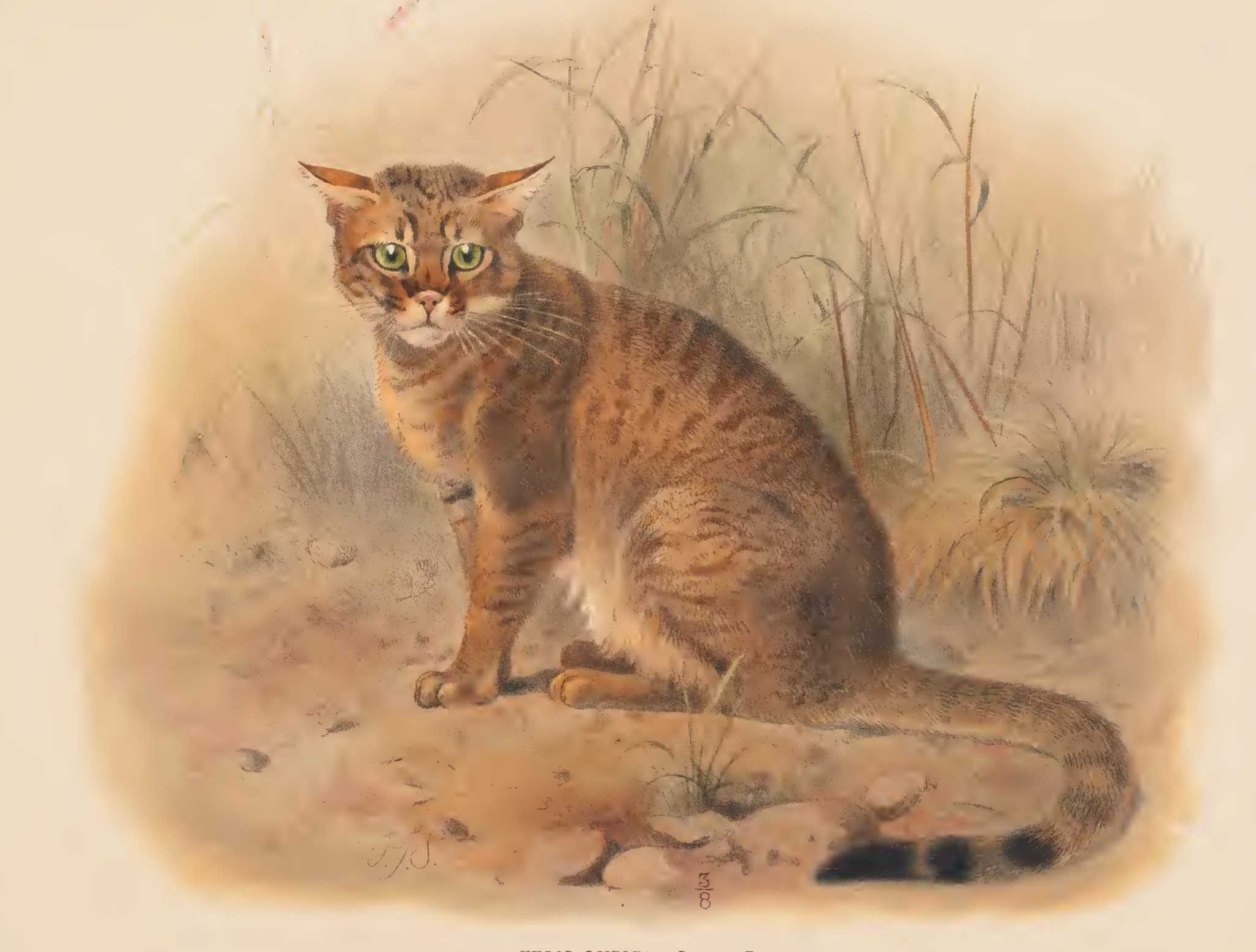
African wildcat, illustration in Zoology of Egypt (1898)

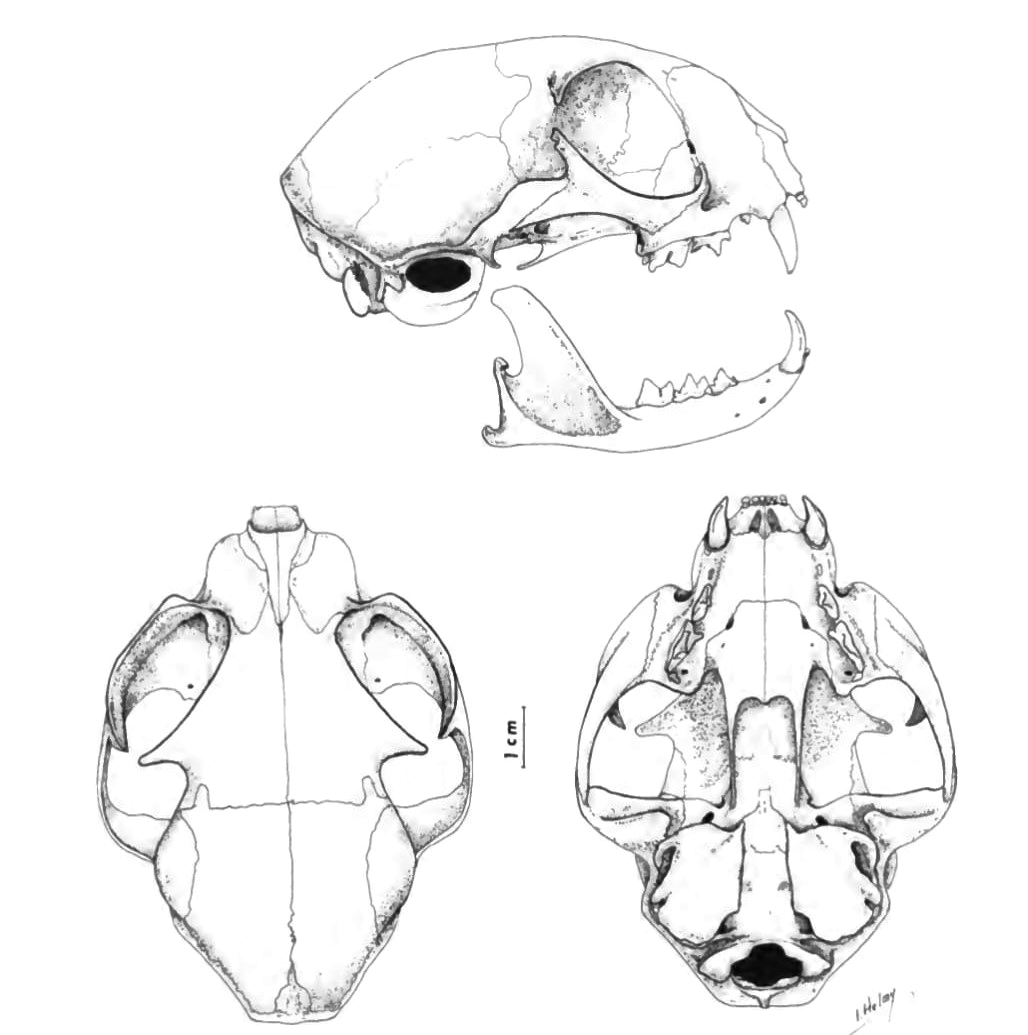
Illustration of an African wildcat skull

The fur of the African wildcat is light sandy grey, and sometimes with a pale yellow or reddish hue, but almost whitish on the belly and on the throat. The ears have small tufts, are reddish to grey, with long light yellow hairs around the pinna. The stripes around the face are dark ochre to black: two run horizontally on the cheek from the outer corner of the eye to the jaw, a smaller one from the inner corner of the eye to the rhinarium, and four to six across the throat. Two dark rings encircle the forelegs, and hind legs are striped. A dark stripe runs along the back, the flanks are lighter. Pale vertical stripes on the sides often dissolve into spots. Its tail has two to three rings towards the end with a black tip. Its feet are dark brown to black below.

Skins of male African wildcats from Northern Africa measure 47–59.7 cm (18.5–23.5 in) in head-to-body length with a 26.7–36.8 cm (10.5–14.5 in) long tail. Skins of female wildcats measure 40.6–55.8 cm (16.0–22.0 in) with a 24.1–33.7 cm (9.5–13.3 in) long tail. Male wildcats from Yemen measure 46–57 cm (18–22 in) in head-to-body length with a 25–32 cm (9.8–12.6 in) long tail; females were slightly smaller measuring 50–51 cm (20–20 in) in head-to-body length with a 25–28 cm (9.8–11.0 in) long tail. Both females and males range in weight from 3.2–4.5 kg (7.1–9.9 lb).

The African wildcat differs from the European wildcat by inconspicuous stripes on the nape and shoulders, a less sharply defined stripe across the spine and by the slender tail, which is cylindrical, less bushy and more tapering. Ears are normally tipped with a small tuft. Its fur is shorter than of the European wildcat, and it is considerably smaller.

== Distribution and habitat ==
The African wildcat occurs throughout Africa, as well as in the Middle East including parts of the Arabian Peninsula and most of Iran. Its range extends northeast into Central Asia, where it occurs along the eastern shores of the Caspian Sea, and through Kazakhstan to as far east as Xinjiang. It is also present in parts of India.

It tolerates a wide variety of habitats. In deserts such as the Sahara, it occurs at much lower densities and is most common in areas with rugged terrain such as the Hoggar Mountains. It ranges across the area north of the Sahara from Morocco to Egypt and inhabits the tropical and subtropical grasslands, savannas, and shrublands south of the Sahara from Mauritania to the Horn of Africa, including Somalia, Eritrea, Ethiopia, Djibouti and Sudan. It inhabits every country of East and Southern Africa, although it is absent from the dense tropical rainforests of the Congo Basin.

=== In Mediterranean islands ===
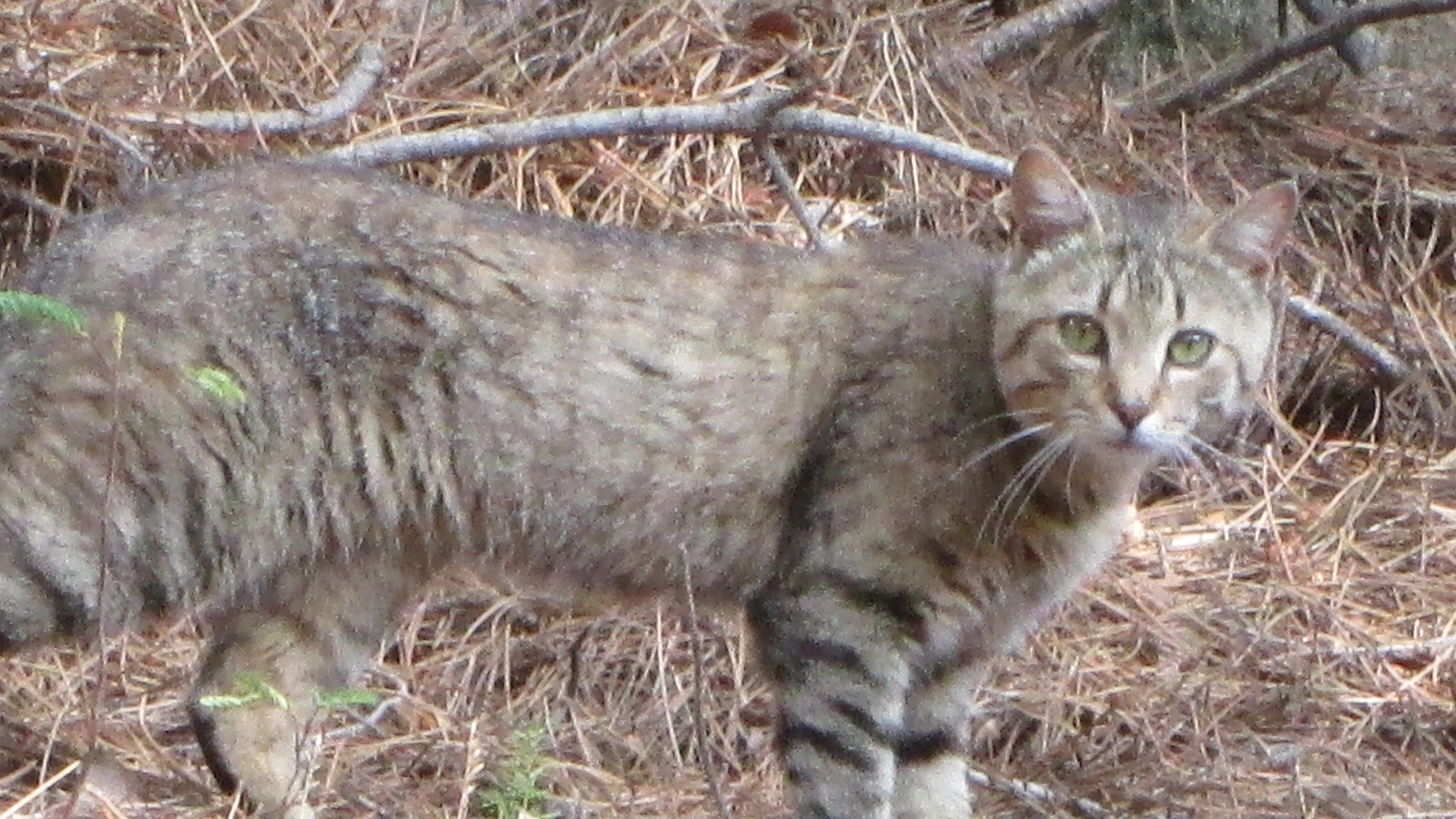
The wild cat in Sardinia is of domestic cat origin.

The wild cat in Sardinia and Corsica was long considered to be an African wildcat subspecies with the scientific name Felis lybica sarda. Results of zooarchaeological research indicate that it descended from domestic cats that were introduced probably at the beginning of the first millennium and originated in the Near East. These populations are feral today.

The wildcat on the island of Sicily is a European wildcat.

== Ecology and behaviour ==
African wildcats are active mainly by night and search for prey. Their hearing is so fine that they can locate prey precisely. They approach prey by patiently crawling forward and using vegetation to hide. They rarely drink water. They hunt primarily mice, rats, birds, reptiles, and insects.

When confronted, the African wildcat raises its hair to make itself seem larger in order to intimidate its opponent. In the daytime it usually hides in the bushes, although it is sometimes active on dark, cloudy days. The territory of a male overlaps with that of up to three females.

=== Hunting and diet ===
In West Africa, the African wildcat preys on rats, mice, gerbils, hares, small to medium-sized birds, including francolins, and lizards. In Southern Africa, it also attacks antelope fawns and domestic stock, such as lambs and goat kids. In Kgalagadi Transfrontier Park, it preys foremost on murids, to a lesser extent also on birds, small reptiles and invertebrates. In northern Namibia, it also hunts Kirk's dik-dik of similar body mass.

=== Reproduction ===
The female's gestation period lasts between 56 and 60 days. In Botswana, she gives birth mostly during the warm wet season to one to three kittens. Litters of up to five kittens were also observed. Her birthing den is a sheltered place like dense grass, a burrow or hollow tree. The kittens open their eyes after about 10–14 days and are mobile at the age of one month. At around three months of age, they start learning hunting techniques from their mother. They leave the family and become independent at the age of around six months.

== Conservation ==
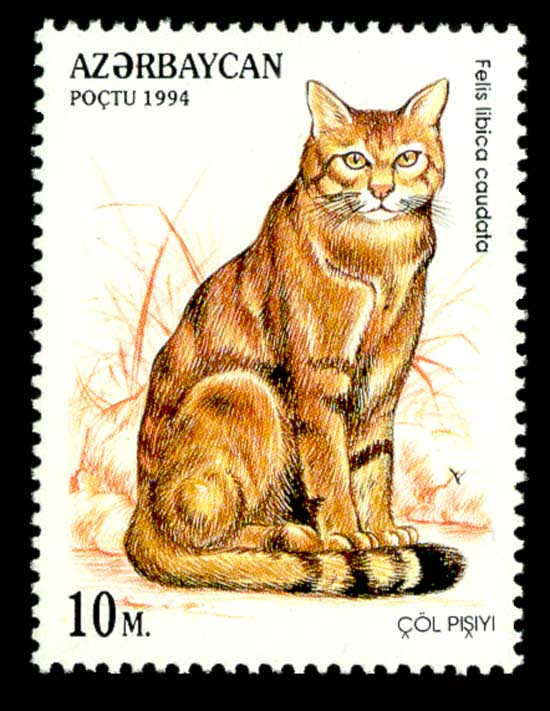
African wildcat on a 1994 stamp of Azerbaijan

The African wildcat is included in CITES Appendix II.

Due to their physical similarity, hybridization produces less visible effects in Asian steppe-type wildcats than among European forest wildcats. It can thus be difficult to distinguish "pure" Asian wildcats from free-living domestic cats when these inhabit the same locations, and it is possible that some Asian populations derive primarily from feral cats.

It has been discovered that a domestic cat can serve as a surrogate mother for wildcat embryos. The numerous similarities between the two species mean that an embryo of an African wildcat may be carried and borne by a domestic cat. A documentary by the BBC describes the details of the experiments that led to this discovery, and also shows a mature wildcat that was born by a surrogate female.

The Libyan Posts issued a postage stamp dedicated to the African wildcat in November 1997 in cooperation with World Wide Fund for Nature. This issue was also released as a set of four stamps printed on a minisheet.
