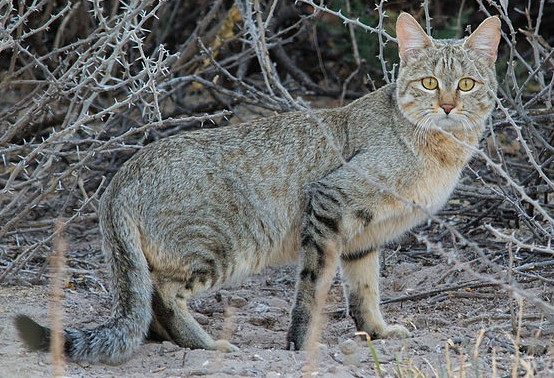

Scientific classification
- Kingdom: Animalia
- Phylum: Chordata
- Class: Mammalia
- Order: Carnivora
- Family: Felidae
- Genus: Felis
- Species: F. lybica
- Subspecies: F. l. cafra

Trinomial name
- Felis lybica cafra Desmarest, 1822
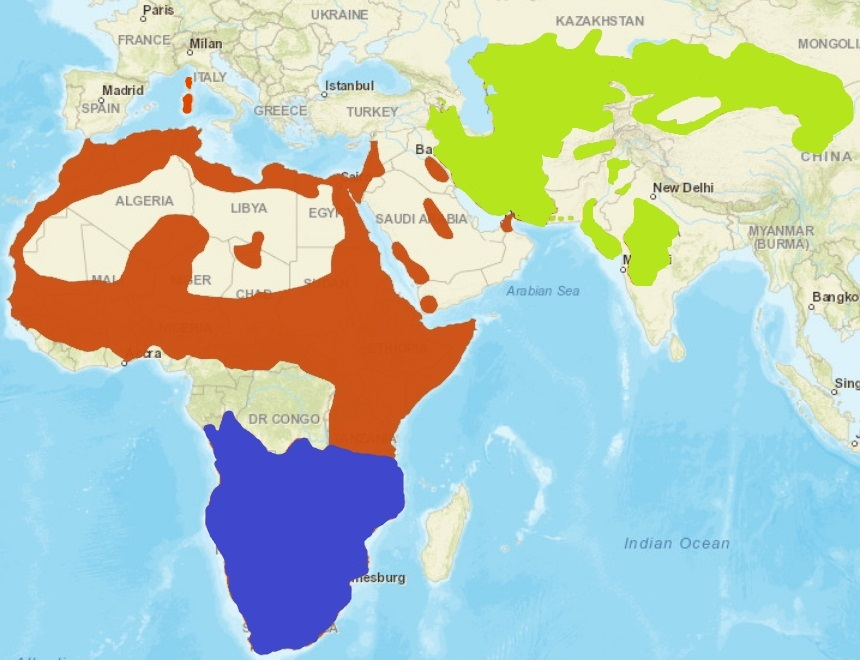
- Range of the Southern African wildcat

= Southern African wildcat =

Subspecies of carnivore

The Southern African wildcat (Felis lybica cafra) is an African wildcat subspecies native to Southern and Eastern Africa. In 2007, it was tentatively recognised as a distinct subspecies on the basis of genetic analysis. Morphological evidence indicates that the split between the African wildcat subspecies in Africa occurred in the area of Tanzania and Mozambique.

It is also known in English as the 'bush cat'.

== Characteristics ==
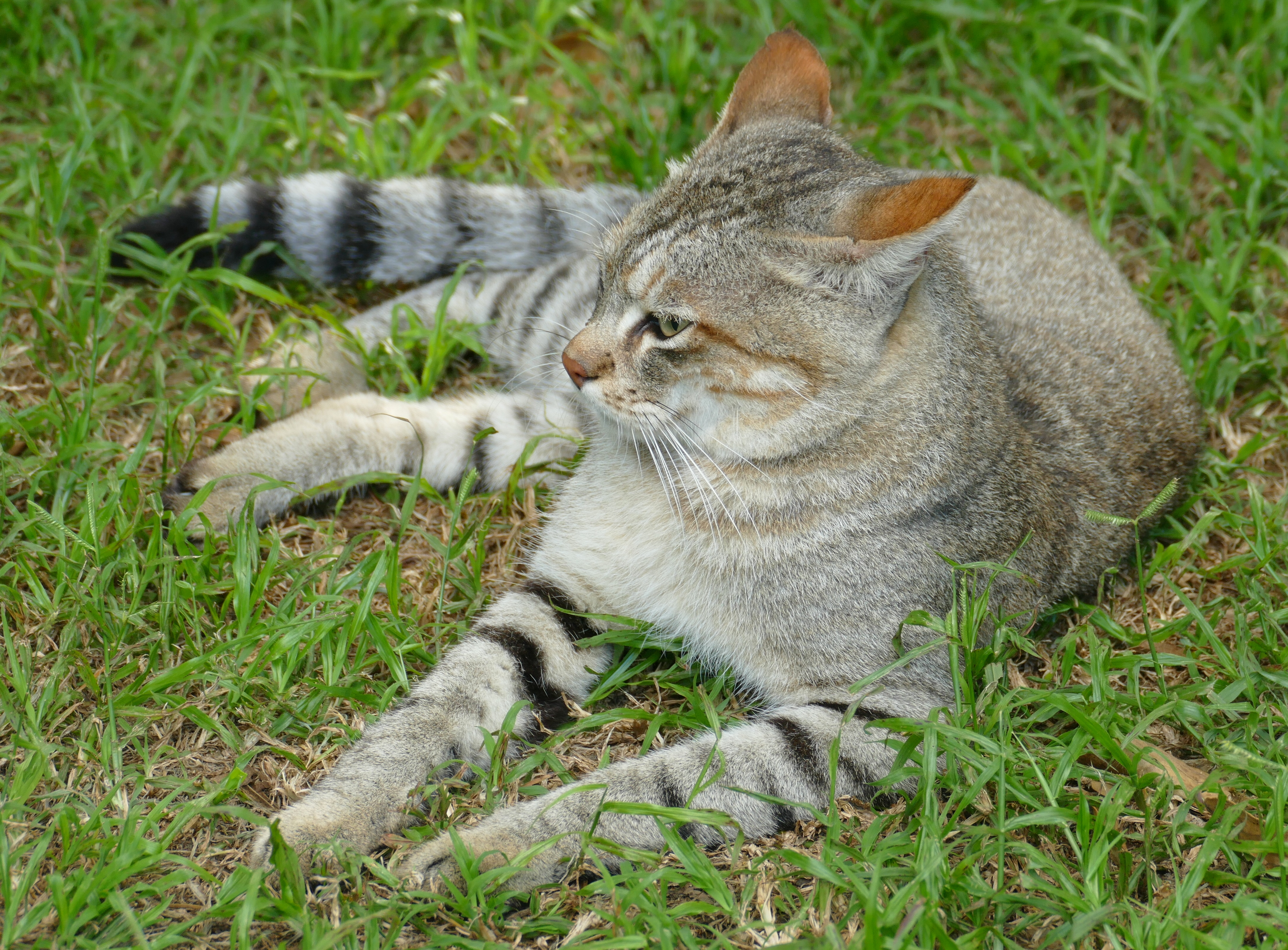
Female Southern African wildcat in a game park

The body of the Southern African wildcat is marked with vertical stripes but these can vary from faint to quite distinct. The tail is ringed with black and has a black tip. The chin and throat are white and the chest is usually paler than the rest of the body. The feet are jet black underneath. There are two colour phases; iron-gray, with black and whitish speckling, and tawny-grey, with less black and more buffy speckling. In appearance it is very similar to a domestic cat, although the legs are proportionately longer. The most distinguishable characteristic is the rich reddish-brown colour on the backs of the ears, over the belly and on the back legs. Its body length is 46–66.5 cm (18.1–26.2 in) with a 25–36 cm (9.8–14.2 in) long tail; and weight range 2.4–5.5 kg (5.3–12.1 lb).

== Distribution and habitat ==
The Southern African wild cat is widely distributed throughout Africa south of the equator, but does not occur along the Namibian coast. It tolerates a wide range of habitats that provide some sort of cover.

== Ecology and behaviour ==
Southern African wildcats are largely nocturnal, finding cover in which to rest during the day. Their habits are solitary, except for mating and raising their young, and they are highly territorial. They are adaptable predators, preferring to hunt small rodents, but able to change their diet according to seasonal and longer-term prey abundances and availability; they have been observed to take other small mammals, birds, reptiles, amphibians, insects and other invertebrates. The largest recorded prey include hares, springhares and birds up to the size of guineafowl.

== Threats ==
The Southern African wildcat is threatened due to being killed as pest in southern Africa. It is also sold as pet.
