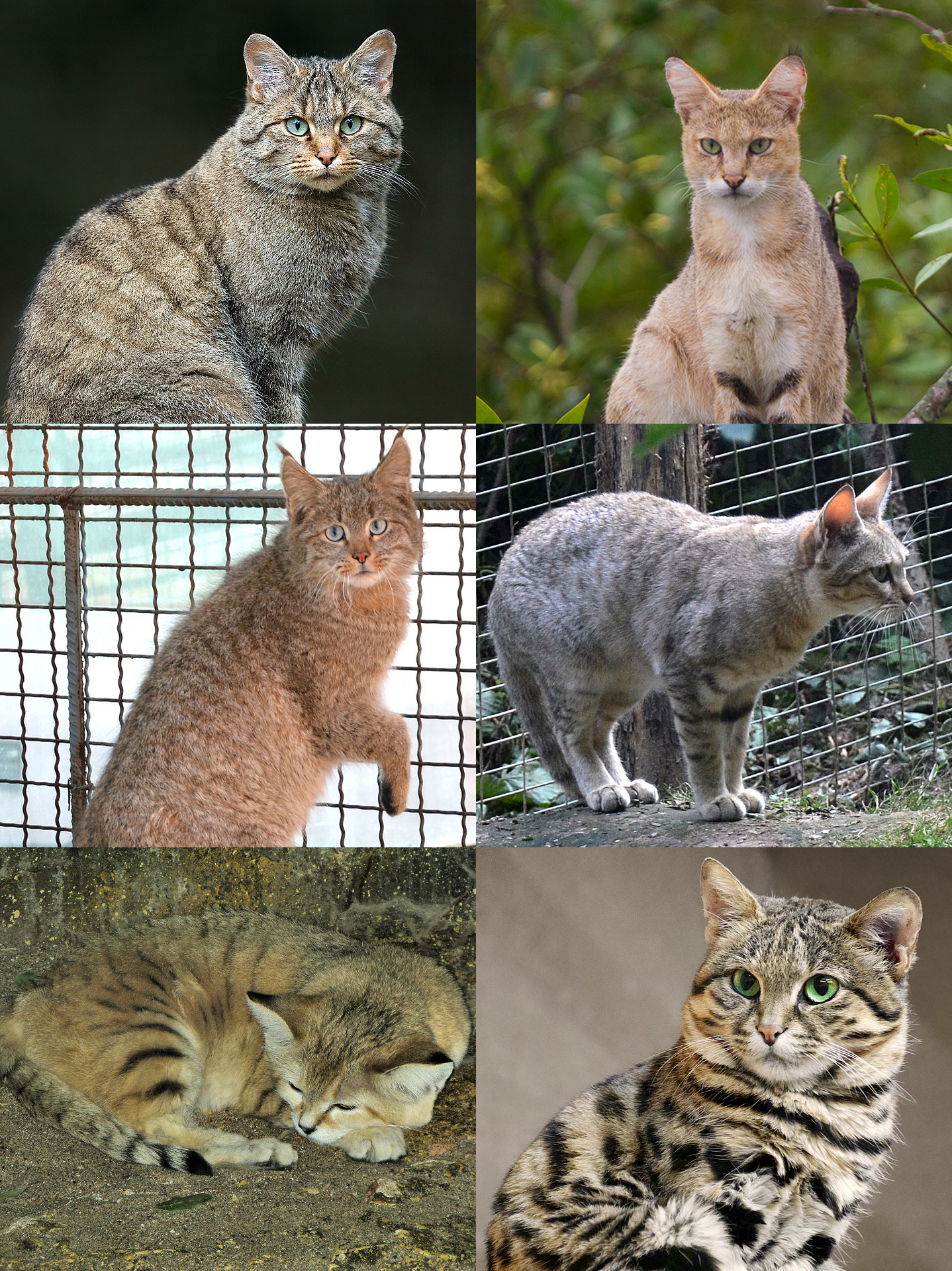
- The six wild Felis species; from top-left, clockwise: European wildcat (F. silvestris), jungle cat (F. chaus), African wildcat (F. lybica), black-footed cat (F. nigripes), sand cat (F. margarita), Chinese mountain cat (F. bieti)

Scientific classification
- Kingdom: Animalia
- Phylum: Chordata
- Class: Mammalia
- Infraclass: Placentalia
- Order: Carnivora
- Family: Felidae
- Subfamily: Felinae
- Genus: Felis; Linnaeus, 1758

Type species
- Felis catus Linnaeus, 1758

Species
- See § Taxonomy
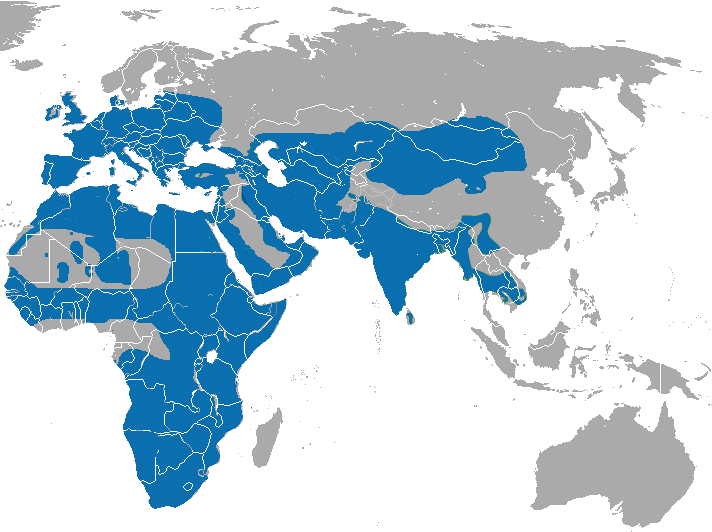
- Native Felis range

= Felis =

Felis Temporal range: Piacenzian–Holocene, 3.4–0 Ma

Genus of mammals (cats)

Felis is a genus of small and medium-sized cat species native to most of Africa and south of 60° latitude in Europe and Asia to Indochina. The genus includes the domestic cat. The smallest of the seven Felis species is the black-footed cat with a head and body length from 38 to 42 cm (15 to 17 in). The largest is the jungle cat with a head and body length from 62 to 76 cm (24 to 30 in).

Genetic studies indicate that the Felinae genera Felis, Otocolobus and Prionailurus diverged from a Eurasian progenitor of the Felidae about 6.2 million years ago, and that Felis species split off 3.04 to 0.99 million years ago.

== Etymology ==
The generic name Felis is derived from Classical Latin fēlis meaning 'cat, ferret'.

== Taxonomy ==
Carl Linnaeus considered Felis to comprise all cat species known until 1758. Later taxonomists split the cat family into different genera. In 1917, the British zoologist Reginald Innes Pocock revised the genus Felis as comprising only the ones listed in the following table. Estimated genetic divergence times of the listed species are indicated in million years ago (Mya), based on analysis of autosomal, xDNA, yDNA and mtDNA gene segments.

Species	Image	IUCN Red List status and distribution
Domestic cat (F. catus) Linnaeus, 1758		NE; Worldwide in association with humans or feral
European wildcat (F. silvestris) Schreber, 1777		LC
Jungle cat (F. chaus) Schreber, 1777		LC
African wildcat (F. lybica) Forster, 1780		LC
Black-footed cat (F. nigripes) Burchell, 1824		VU
Sand cat (F. margarita) Loche, 1858		LC
Chinese mountain cat (F. bieti) Milne-Edwards, 1892		VU

Pocock accepted the Pallas's cat as the only member of the genus Otocolobus. Other scientists consider it also a Felis species.

Several scientists consider the Chinese mountain cat a subspecies of F. silvestris.

=== Phylogeny ===
The phylogenetic relationships of living Felis species are shown in the following cladogram:

- Felidae
  - Felinae
    - - - Felis
          - - - - - - - African wildcat (F. lybica)
                      - Domestic cat (F. catus)
                    - European wildcat (F. silvestris)
                  - Chinese mountain cat (F. bieti)
              - Sand cat (F. margarita)
            - Black-footed cat (F. nigripes)
          - Jungle cat (F. chaus)
      - other Felinae lineages
- Pantherinae

=== Extinct Felis species ===
Extinct Felis species in the fossil record include:

- Felis lunensis (Martelli, 1906)
- Felis wenzensis (Stach, 1961)

== Characteristics ==
Felis species have high and wide skulls, short jaws and narrow ears with short tufts, but without any white spots on the back of the ears. Their pupils contract to a vertical slit. A black cat from Transcaucasia described in 1904 as F. daemon by Satunin turned out to be a feral cat, probably a hybrid of wildcat and domestic cat. The Kellas cat is a hybrid between domestic cat and European wildcat occurring in Scotland.

The Corsican wildcat is considered to have been introduced to Corsica before the beginning of the 1st millennium. A genetic study of a dozen individuals showed that they are closely related to the African wildcat originating in the Middle East.
