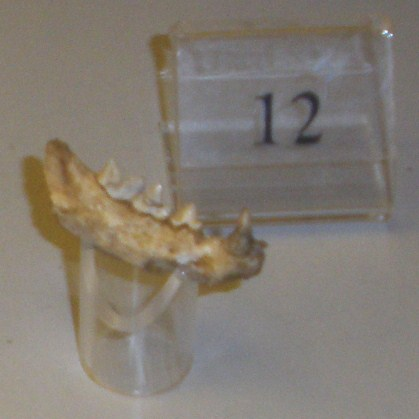
- Fragment of f. lunensis fossilized jawbone, at Museo di Paleontologia di Firenze

Scientific classification
- Domain: Eukaryota
- Kingdom: Animalia
- Phylum: Chordata
- Class: Mammalia
- Order: Carnivora
- Suborder: Feliformia
- Family: Felidae
- Subfamily: Felinae
- Genus: Felis
- Species: †F. lunensis

Binomial name
- †Felis lunensis Martelli, 1906

Synonyms
- Felis silvestris lunensis Martelli's cat

= Felis lunensis =

Felis lunensis Temporal range: Pliocene to Pleistocene 2.5–0.0781 Ma

Extinct species of felid

Felis lunensis, or the Martelli's cat is an extinct felid of the subfamily Felinae.

== Evolution and taxonomy ==
Around 12 million years ago, the genus Felis appeared and eventually gave rise to many of the modern small cats. Felis lunensis was one of the first modern Felis species, appearing around 2.5 million years ago in the Pliocene. Fossil specimens of F. lunensis have been recovered in Italy and Hungary. Fossil evidence suggests the modern European wildcat Felis silvestris may have evolved from F. lunensis during the Middle Pleistocene. This has resulted in F. lunensis occasionally being considered a subspecies of Felis silvestris.

Felis lunensis first described by Alessandro Martelli in 1906 was a mandible excavated in Pliocene deposits near Olivola in Tuscany. The holotype specimen is now preserved in the collection of the University of Florence in Italy.
