= Feral cat =

Unowned or untamed domestic cat in the outdoors

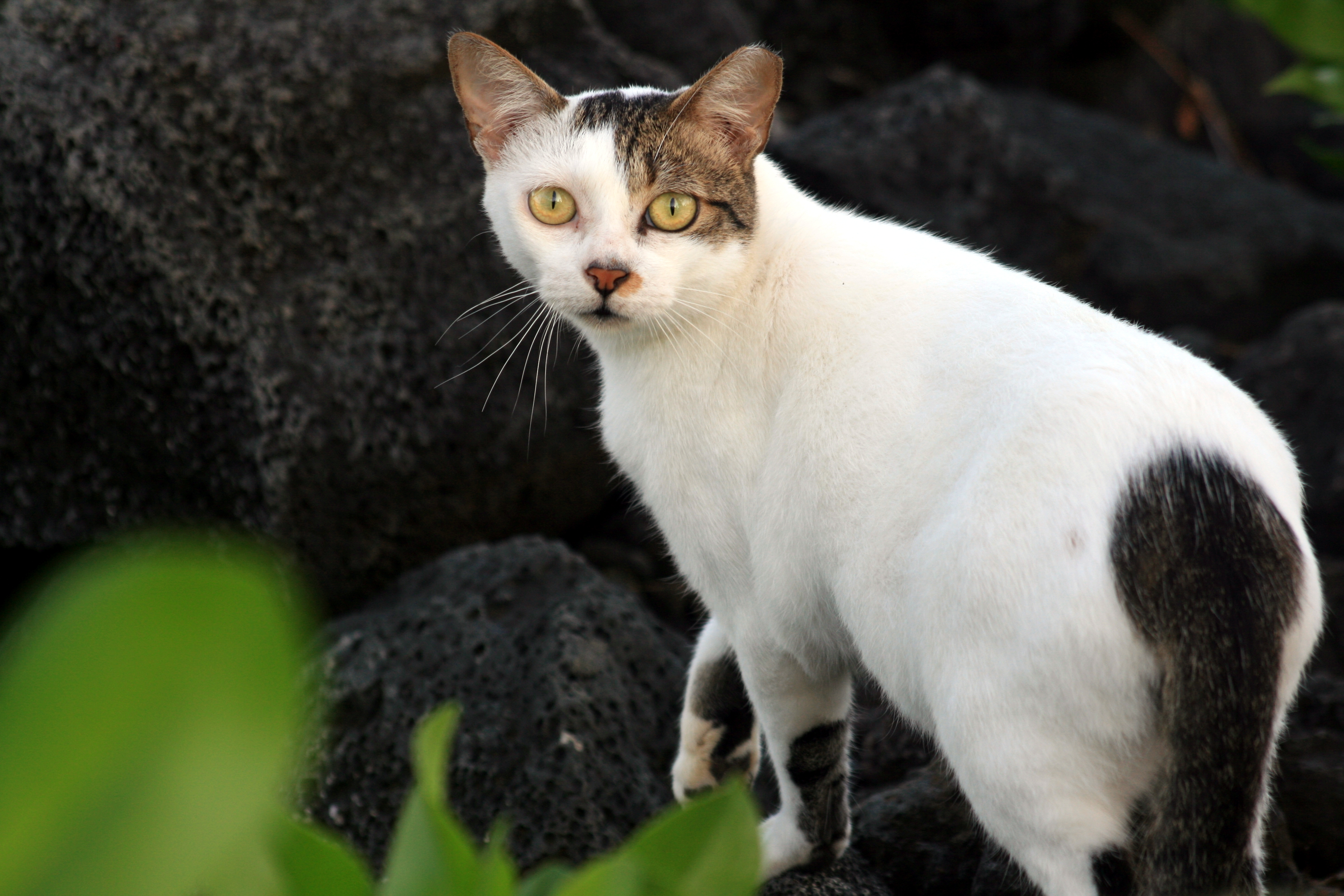
A feral cat with a tipped ear, indicating it was neutered in a trap-neuter-return program

A feral cat is an unowned domestic cat (Felis catus) that lives freely outdoors and avoids human contact; it does not allow itself to be handled or touched, and usually remains hidden from humans. Feral cats may breed over dozens of generations and become a mesopredator or even a local apex predator in urban, savannah and bushland environments, especially on islands where native animals did not evolve alongside natural predators. Some feral cats may become more comfortable with people who regularly feed them, but even with long-term attempts at socialization, they usually remain aloof and are most active after dusk. Of the 700 million cats in the world, an estimated 480 million are feral.

Feral cats are devastating to wildlife, especially birds, and conservation biologists consider them to be one of the worst invasive species. They are included in IUCN's list of the world's 100 worst invasive alien species. Attempts to control feral cat populations are widespread but generally of greatest impact within purpose-fenced reserves.

Some animal rights groups advocate trap-neuter-return programs to prevent the feral cats from continuing to breed. Scientific evidence has demonstrated that TNR is not effective at controlling feral cat populations.

Feral cats are often differentiated from stray cats. A common distinction is that feral cats live far from humans and do not interact with them, while stray cats live near humans, rely indirectly on them, and may be more open to human contact. The distinction between the terms varies in different countries.

== Definitions ==
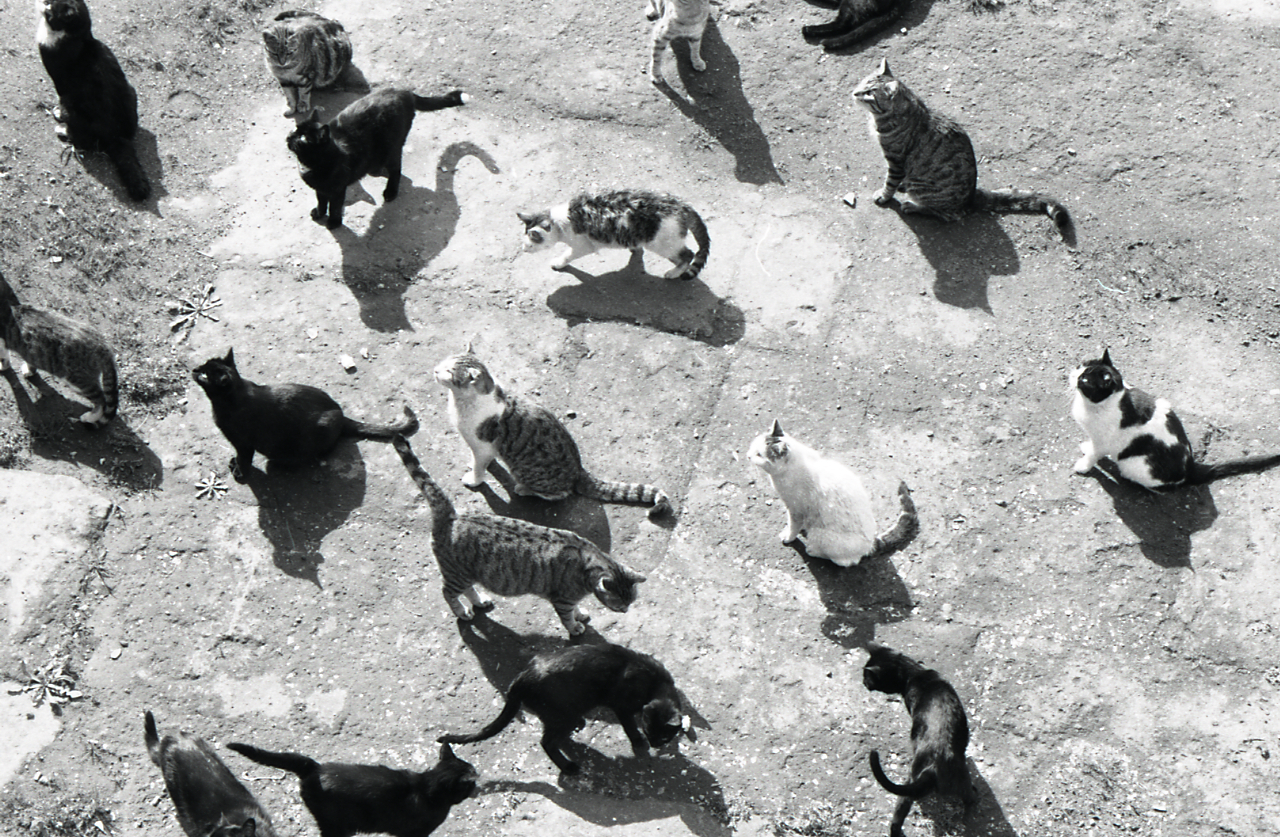
Feral cats in Largo di Torre Argentina, Rome. Photo by Paolo Monti, 1969.

The meaning of the term feral cat varies between professions and countries, and is sometimes used interchangeably with other terms such as free-roaming, street, alley, or community cat. Some of these terms are also used to refer to stray cats, although stray and feral cats are generally considered to be different by rescuers, veterinarians, and researchers. The lines between stray and feral cat are diffuse. The general idea is that owned cats that wander away from their homes may become stray cats, and stray cats that have lived in the wild for some time may become feral. A common distinction is that feral cats live far from humans and do not interact with them, while stray cats live near humans, rely indirectly on them, and may be more open to human contact. The distinction may be applied based on level of sociability; cats who avoid human interaction and have not been socialised may be called feral, while cats who are used to human contact and are deemed adoptable may be called stray. These terms are applied differently in different countries.

Activists who seek to normalize feral cats in the environment are attempting to rebrand feral cats as community cats. Biologists say that this new term is euphemistic and distracts from feral cats being an environmental problem, and that it has connotations that falsely imply that feral cats exist with the consent of the communities where they live, and that the public has a moral obligation to support them in the outdoors. Studies have shown that the use of language in surveys appears to influence the levels of support for different management options.

=== United Kingdom ===
In the United Kingdom, a feral cat is defined as a cat that chooses not to interact with humans, survives with or without human assistance, and hides or defends itself when trapped rather than allowing itself to be handled. Animal rescuers and veterinarians consider cats to be feral when they had not had much human contact particularly before eight weeks of age, avoid humans, and prefer to escape rather than attack a human. Feral cats are distinguished from domesticated cats based on their levels of socialization, ownership, and confinement, and on the amount of fear of, interaction with, and dependence upon humans. However, veterinarians and rescuers disagreed on whether a feral cat would tend to hiss and spit at or attack a human during an encounter, and disagreed on whether adult feral cats could potentially be tamed.

=== Italy ===
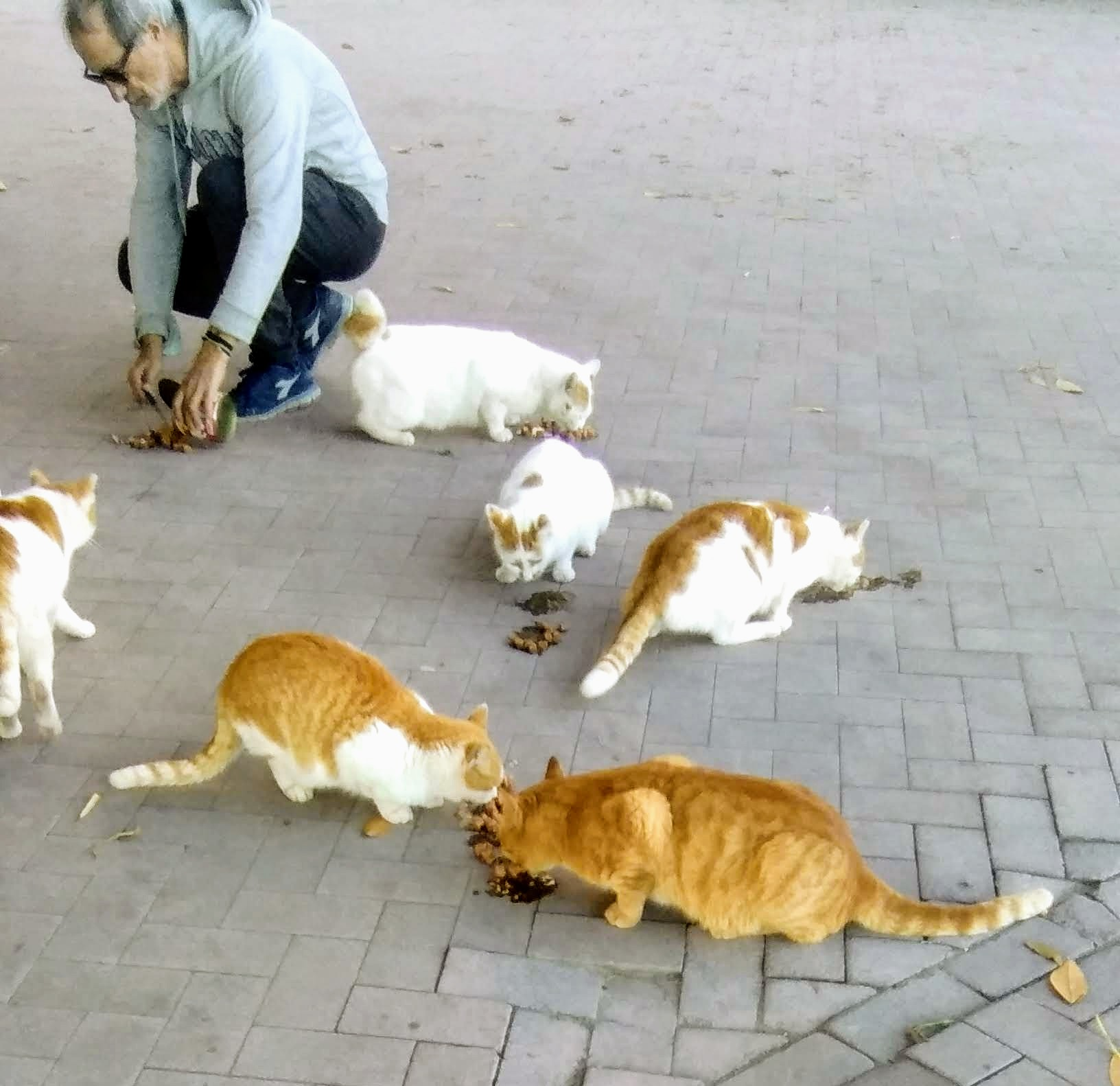
Colony of semi-feral cats in Messina harbour, Italy. They are regularly fed by the local fishermen.

In Italy, feral cats have been protected since 1991, and it is illegal to kill them. In Rome, they are surgically neutered by veterinarians of the Veterinary Public Services. Programs for sterilization of stray cats are also implemented in the Padua and Venice Provinces.

=== United States ===
A survey of rescue and veterinary facilities in the United States revealed that no widely accepted definition of a feral cat exists. Many facilities used waiting periods to evaluate whether a cat was feral by observing whether the cat became less afraid and evasive over time. Other indicators included the cat's response to touch with an inanimate object, and observation of the cats' social behavior in varying environments such as response to human contact, with a human nearby, or when moved to a quieter environment.

=== Australia ===
The Australian Government categorizes cats who have no interaction with or assistance from humans as feral, and unowned cats who rely on humans as semi-feral or stray. However, even these so-called 'managed colonies' often have a devastating impact on wildlife as demonstrated in the decimation of native mammals in adjacent reserves, such as occurred with numbats and woylies in Western Australia. Feral cats are ranked as the highest threat to Australia's mammals, and the Australian Government's Threatened Species Strategy identifies tackling feral cats as its top priority for action, with a threat factor more than double that of the next highest threat. An introduced predator, feral cats have contributed to the extinction of at least 28 mammal species, wreak havoc on threatened animals and plants on the brink of extinction, kill over 1.5 billion native mammals, birds, reptiles and frogs and 1.1 billion invertebrates in Australia each year, and are a recognised threat to over 200 nationally threatened species.

=== Farm cat ===
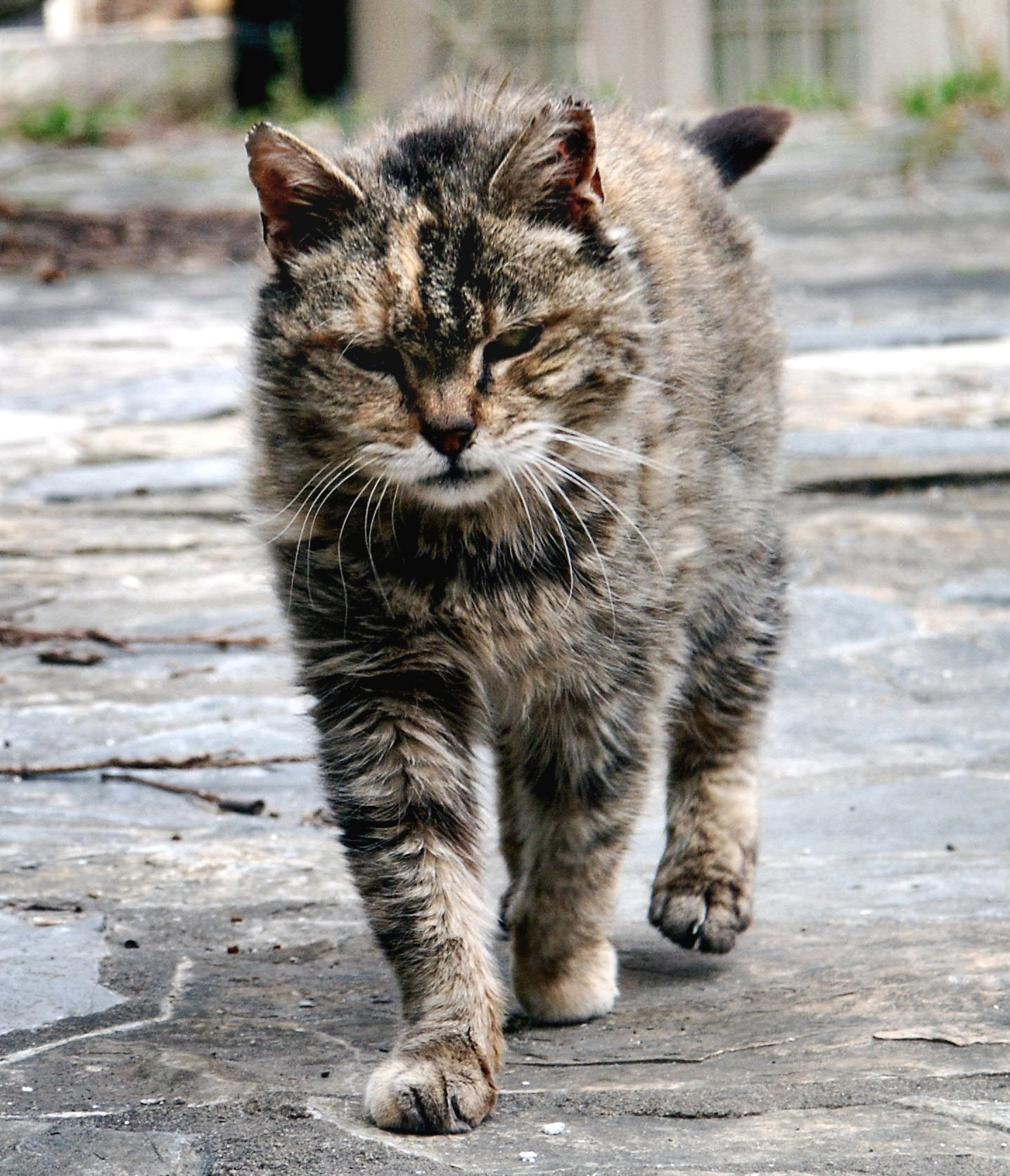
A farm cat

A farm cat is a free-ranging domestic cat that lives in a cat colony on agricultural farms in a feral or semi-feral condition. Farm cats primarily live outdoors and usually shelter in barns. They are partially supplied with food and milk, but mainly subsist on hunting rodents, such as black rat, brown rat, common vole and Apodemus species. In England, farm cat colonies are present on the majority of farms and consist of up to 30 cats. Female farm cats show allomothering behaviour; they use communal nests and take care of kittens of other colony members.

Some animal rescue organizations maintain Barn Cat Programs and rehome neutered feral cats to people who are looking for barn cats.

=== Ship's cat ===
Domestic cats have been members of ship crews since the beginning of commercial navigation. Phoenician and Etruscan traders probably carried cats on board their trading vessels to Italy and the Mediterranean islands.

== History ==
Cats in ancient Egypt were venerated for killing rodents and venomous snakes. The need to keep rodents from consuming or contaminating grain crops stored for later human consumption may be the original reason that cats were domesticated. The spread of cats throughout much of the world is thought to have originated in Egypt. Scientists do not agree on whether cats were domesticated in Ancient Egypt or introduced there after domestication. Phoenician traders brought them to Europe for control of rat populations, and monks brought them further into Asia. Roman armies also contributed spreading cats and eventually brought them to Britain. Since then, cats continued to be introduced to new countries, often by sailors or settlers. Cats are thought to have been introduced to Australia in either the 1600s by Dutch shipwrecks, or the late 1700s by English settlers. These domesticated cats began to form feral populations after their offspring began living away from human contact.

In the 19th and 20th centuries, several cat specimens were described as wildcat subspecies that are considered feral cat populations today:

- Felis reyi, proposed by Louis Lavauden in 1929, was a skin and a skull of a specimen from Biguglia in Corsica that was smaller and darker than the European wildcat (Felis silvestris), had a much shorter tail than the African wildcat, and differed in fur colour and markings from both. When Reginald Innes Pocock reviewed Felis skins in the collection of the Natural History Museum, London, he considered Felis reyi a synonym of Felis lybica sarda, the Sardinian wild cat. The Corsican wildcat is considered to have been introduced in the early first millennium. The earliest known fossil records of cats date to the early 14th century, but older chronostratigraphic layers revealed fossils of livestock introduced since the Iron Age.
- Felis lybica jordansi, proposed by Ernst Schwarz in 1930, was a skull and skin of a male specimen from Santa Margarita in Mallorca that had more pronounced stripes than the African wildcat. This is also considered to have descended from domestic cats introduced to the island.
- Felis silvestris cretensis, proposed by Theodor Haltenorth in 1953, was a cat skin purchased in a bazaar in Chania that resembled an African wildcat, but had a bushy tail like a European wildcat. Groves considered the Cretan wildcat an introduced feral cat.

== Distribution and habitat ==
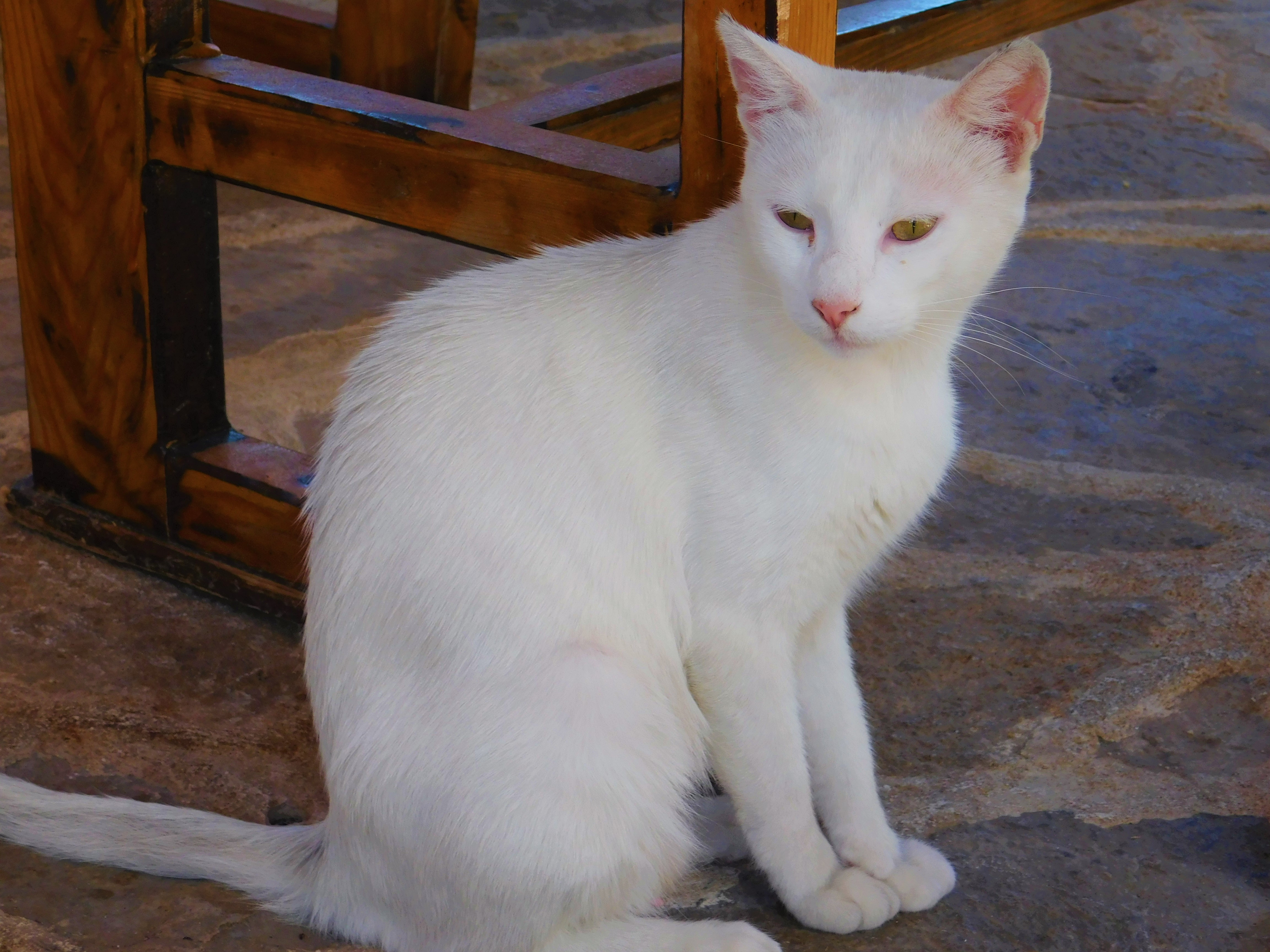
Feral cat in Drašnice, Croatia

The feral cat is the most widely distributed terrestrial carnivore. It occurs between 55° North and 54.3° South latitudes in a wide range of climatic zones and islands in the Atlantic, Indian and Pacific Oceans, and the Mediterranean Sea, including Canary Islands, Port-Cros, Dassen Island, Marion Island, Juan de Nova Island, Réunion, Hahajima, Okinawa Island, Raoul Island, Herekopare Island, Stewart Island, Macquarie Island, Galápagos Islands, San Clemente Island, Isla Natividad, San José Island, and New Island. Feral cat colonies also occur on the Japanese islands of Ainoshima, Hahajima and Aoshima, Ehime. The feral cat population on the Hawaiian Islands is mainly of European origin and probably arrived in the 19th century on ships.

Feral cat colonies in Rome have been monitored since 1991. Urban feral cats were studied in Madrid, Jerusalem and Ottawa.

A distinct all-black, long-limbed morphology of feral cat, the fitoaty, was first reported from Madagascar in 2013; it is believed to be morphologically and ecologically distinct from the feral Malagasy forest cat.

== Behavior and ecology ==
Some behaviors of feral cats are commonly observed, although there is disagreement among veterinarians, rescuers and researchers on the prevalence of some. In a free-roaming environment, feral cats avoid humans. They do not allow themselves to be handled or touched by humans, and back away or run when they are able to do so. If trapped, they hiss, growl, bare their teeth, or strike out. They remain fairly hidden from humans and will not approach, although some feral cats gradually become more comfortable around humans who feed them regularly.

Most feral cats have small home ranges, although some are more transient and travel long distances. The home ranges of male feral cats, which are generally two or three times larger than those of female cats, are on average under 10 ha (25 acres), but can vary from almost 300 ha (740 acres) to under 1 ha (2.5 acres). This variance is often due to breeding season, access to females, whether the cat is neutered, age, time of day, and availability of prey.

Feral cats depend on the presence of human settlement to subsist. Colonies and stray feral cats will settle in urban, suburban, and rural developments like cities and farms, wherever they can find easy access to food or prey animals. Few to no feral cats are found significantly distant from human settlements. While feral cats prey on other small mammals and reptiles, their home ranges don't change to reflect the seasonal availability of prey animals. This indicates that feral cats have a fairly consistent home range, and migration is more representative of mate availability, consistency in human-related food sources, or other less transient stimuli.

=== Colonies ===
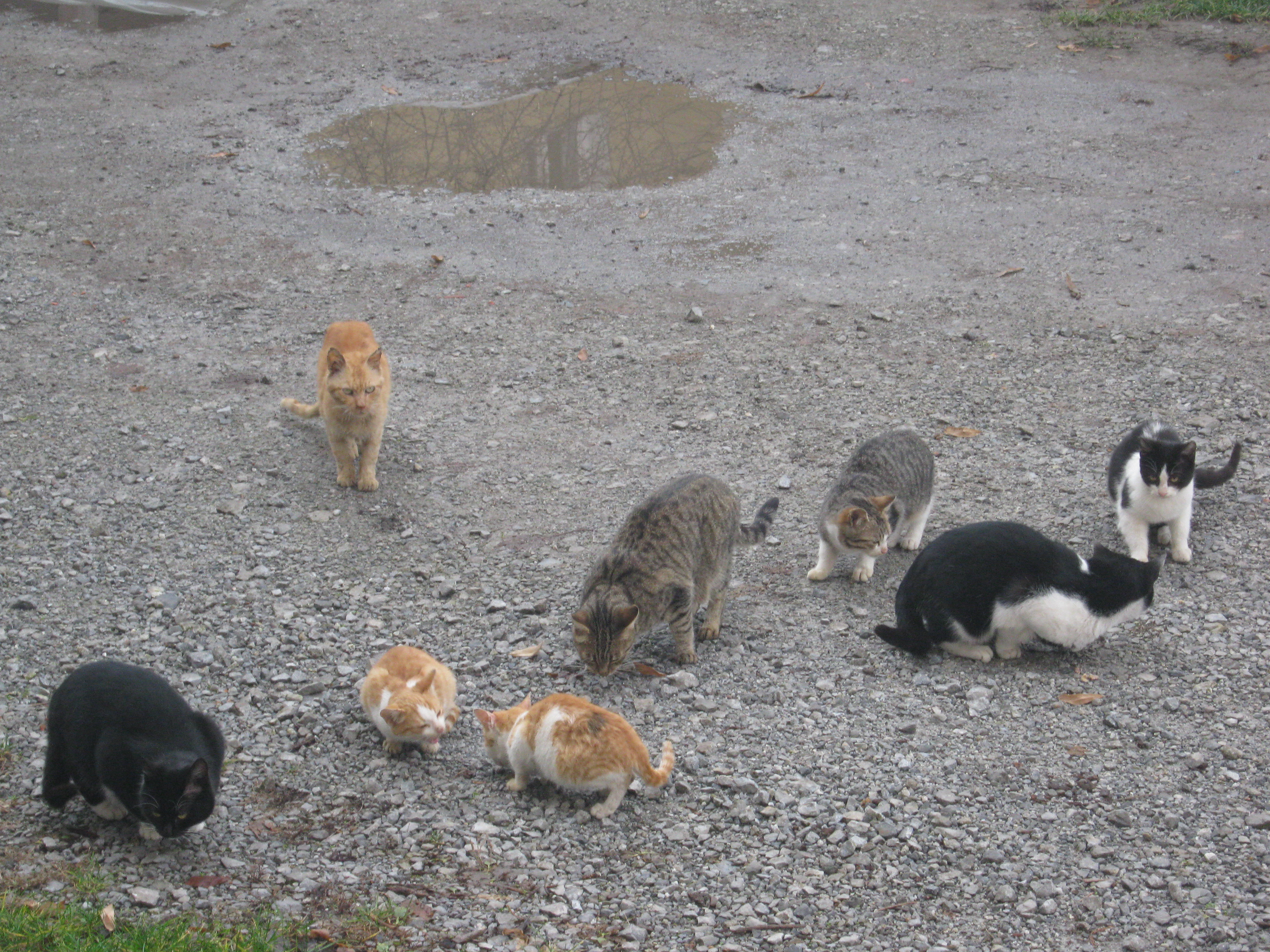
A colony of feral cats

Feral cats often live in groups called colonies, which are located close to food sources and shelter. Researchers disagree on the existence, extent, and structure of dominance hierarchies among feral cats in colonies. Different types of hierarchies have been observed in colonies, including despotic and linear hierarchies. Some colonies are organized in more complex structures, such as relative hierarchies, where social status of individual cats varies with location, time of day, or the activity the cats are engaged in, particularly feeding and mating.

A 'managed colony' is taken care of by humans who supply food and water to the cats, provide shelters and veterinary care, implement trap-neuter-return programs, find foster homes for cats that can be socialized for eventual adoption, and educate people in the neighborhood.

Feral cats are known to move from colony to colony when home ranges overlap. Additionally, colony populations fluctuate as cats leave family homes and some feral and semi-feral cats get socialized to home life and become family pets.

=== Socialization ===
Feral kittens can be trapped and socialized, then adopted into a home. The age at which a kitten becomes difficult to socialize is not agreed upon, but suggestions generally range from seven weeks to four months of age. Although older cats can sometimes be socialized, it is a very long and difficult process, and the cat rarely becomes friendly and may remain fearful.

In a 2013 study with British participants, rescuers tended to be more willing than veterinarians to attempt to tame adult feral cats. Veterinarians tended to be more opposed to this practice, with some expressing concerns for the welfare of such a cat in a home environment. In a 2010 interview survey with veterinarians and rescuers in the United States, 66% of respondents had socialization programs for kittens, and 8% for adult cats.

=== Diet ===
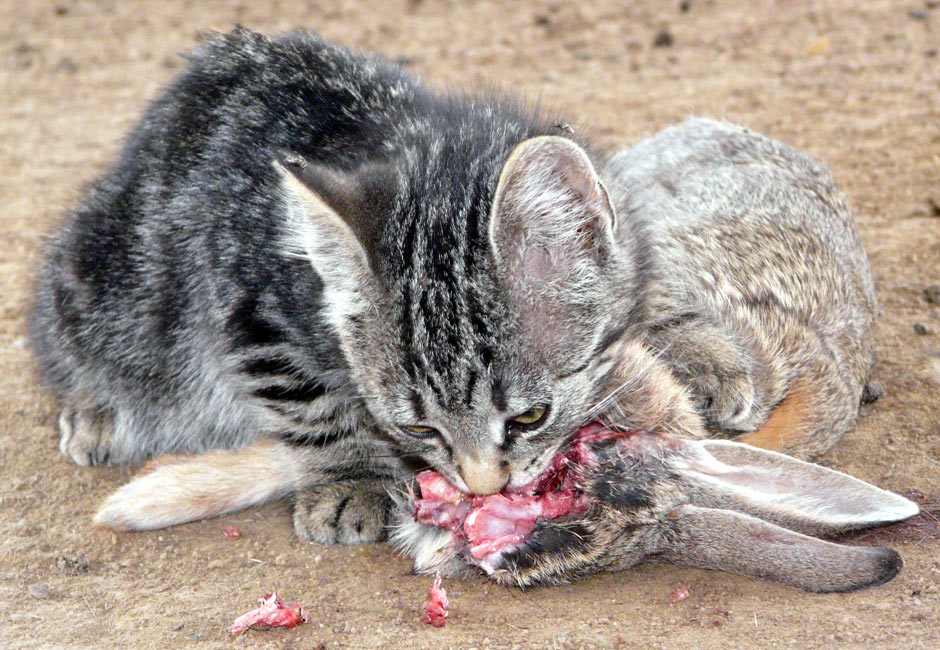
Cats are included on the list of 100 of the World's Worst Invasive Species.

Feral cats are either mesopredators (mid-ranking predators) or apex predators (top predators) in local ecosystems. They prey on a wide variety of both vertebrates and invertebrates, and typically prefer smaller animals with body weights under 100 g (3.5 oz), particularly mammals, birds, and lizards. Their global prey spectrum encompasses over 1,000 species; the most commonly observed were the house mouse, European rabbit, black rat, house sparrow, and common blackbird. In Australia, they prey on introduced species like the European rabbit and house mouse, and on native rodents and marsupials, particularly the common ringtail possum.

In the United States some people advocate for feral cats as a means to control pigeons and invasive rodents like the house mouse and brown rat, although these cosmopolitan species co-evolved with cats in human-disturbed environments and so have an advantage over native rodents in evading cat predation. Studies in California showed that 67% of the mice killed by cats were native species, and that areas near feral cat colonies actually have larger house mouse populations, but fewer birds and native rodents.

Though cats usually prey on animals less than half their size, a feral cat in Australia was photographed killing an adult pademelon of around the cat's weight at 4 kg (8.8 lb).

African feral cats have been observed directly pilfering milk from the elephant seal's teat.

=== Predators ===
Feral cats are prey of feral dogs, dingoes, coyotes, caracals and birds of prey.

== Health ==
=== Life span and survival ===
==== Without human assistance ====
Adult feral cats without human assistance have been found in surprisingly good condition. In Florida, a study of feral cats admitted to a trap-neuter-return (TNR) program concluded that "euthanasia for debilitated cats for humane reasons is rarely necessary". A further study of over 100,000 feral and stray cats admitted to TNR programs in diverse locations of the U.S. resulted in the same 0.4% rate of euthanasia for debilitating conditions. The body condition of feral cats entering a TNR program in Florida was described as "generally lean but not emaciated". However, many feral cats had suffered from parasites such as fleas and ear mites before entering TNR programs.

==== With human assistance ====
Feral cats in managed colonies can live long lives. A number of cats in managed colonies in the United Kingdom died of old age.

A long-term study of a trap-neuter-return (TNR) program on a university campus in Central Florida found that, despite widespread concern about the welfare of free-roaming cats, 83% of the cats studied had been present for more than six years, with almost half first observed as adults of unknown age. The authors compared this result to a 1984 study that found the mean life span for domesticated cats was 7.1 years.

=== Disease ===
==== Types ====
Feral cats, like all cats, are susceptible to diseases and infections including rabies, bartonellosis, toxoplasmosis, feline panleukopenia virus, external and internal parasites, feline immunodeficiency virus (FIV), feline leukemia virus (FeLV), rickettsial diseases, ringworm, and feline respiratory disease complex (a group of respiratory illnesses including feline herpesvirus type 1, feline calicivirus, Chlamydophila felis, and Mycoplasma haemofelis).

Feline leukemia virus and feline immunodeficiency virus belong to the Retroviridae family, and both cause immunosuppression in cats, which can increase their susceptibility to other infections. Research has shown that the prevalence of these viruses among feral cat populations is low and is similar to prevalence rates for owned cats in the United States.

Researchers studying 553 feral cats in North Florida in the United States tested them for a number of infections that could be detrimental to feline or human health. The study found the most prevalent infection to be Bartonella henselae, the cause of cat-scratch disease in humans, with 33.6% of the cats testing positive. Feline coronavirus was the next most common infection, found in 18.3% of the cats, although they noted that the antibody levels were low in most of the cats who tested positive, and concluded that the cats they tested did not appear to be at a greater risk for shedding the virus than pet cats. Researchers studying 96 feral cats on Prince Edward Island in Canada found that feline roundworm was the most common infection in cats in that colony, afflicting 34% of cats. This was followed by Toxoplasma gondii, which was detected in 29.8% of cats, although only one cat of the 78 for whom fecal samples were available was shedding T. gondii oocysts. They did note that most fecal samples collected indicated the presence of one intestinal parasite, with some samples indicating the presence of multiple parasites.

==== Transmission to humans ====
The Center for Disease Control and Prevention has warned about the rabies risk associated with feral cats. With 16% of people infected with rabies from exposure to rabid cats, cats have been the primary animals responsible for transmission of the virus to humans in the United States since the efforts to control rabies in dogs in the 1970s. In 2010, there were 303 rabid cats reported within the United States. Although some colony management programs involve administering rabies vaccines, the need to revaccinate every few years makes this challenging to maintain. Furthermore, lack of documentation can mean that contact with vaccinated feral cats may still require post-exposure treatment.

The study of feral cats on Prince Edward Island warned of "considerable zoonotic risk" for transmission of intestinal parasites. Although the authors noted that their study did not provide evidence for great risk associated with T. gondii in cats, they advised that the risk should still be considered, as the infection in humans can cause significant health problems, and cats who are not otherwise transmitting the infection can begin shedding the parasite in times of stress.

== Control and management ==
Feral cats are controlled or managed by various agencies to manage disease, for the protection of native wildlife and to protect their welfare. Control of feral cats can be managed through trapping and euthanasia or other forms of lethal control, or through trap-neuter-return (TNR). Scientific research has not found TNR to be an effective means of controlling the feral cat population. Literature reviews have found that, in the instances where studies documented TNR colonies that declined in population, those declines were being driven primarily by substantial percentages of colony cats being permanently removed from colonies by some combination of re-homing and euthanasia on an ongoing basis. The population of TNR colonies may not decrease significantly because reproduction and immigration can outpace sterilization rates. The growing popularity of TNR, even near areas of particular ecological sensitivity, has been attributed in part to the failure of scientists to communicate the environmental harm caused by feral cats to the public, and their unwillingness to engage with TNR advocates.

Trap-neuter-return involves trapping feral cats, vaccinating, spaying or neutering them, and then returning them to the place where they were originally trapped. TNR programs are prevalent in several countries, including England, Italy, Canada, and the United States, and are supported by many local and state governments. Proponents of TNR argue that it is effective in stopping reproduction and reducing the population over time. TNR results in fewer complaints, as nuisance behaviors diminish following neutering, and the quality of life of the cats is improved. The practice is reported to save money and garner more public support and better morale than efforts that involve killing cats. TNR is popular, but there's little evidence that TNR by itself can control the growing population of free roaming cats.

The International Companion Animal Management Coalition advocates for TNR as a humane method of controlling feral cat populations. In the U.S., the practice is endorsed by the Humane Society of the United States. and the National Animal Control Association, TNR is opposed by the Australian Veterinary Association, the National Audubon Society, the National Wildlife Federation, the Cornell Lab of Ornithology, the American Association of Wildlife Veterinarians, the Wildlife Society, the American Bird Conservancy, and PETA. Some U.S. military bases have TNR programs, but the United States Navy prohibits such programs on Navy land.

In the US, the American Veterinary Medical Association (AVMA), in 2016, adopted a resolution that "encourages collaborative efforts to identify humane and effective alternatives to the destruction of healthy cats for animal control purposes, while minimizing their negative impact on native wildlife and public health." The AVMA voiced support for "properly managed [feral cat] colonies" outside "wildlife-sensitive ecosystems" but stated that "[t]he goal of colony management should be continual reduction and eventual elimination of the colony through attrition." The AVMA stated that "free-roaming abandoned and feral cats that are not in properly managed colonies should be removed from their environment and treated in the same manner as other abandoned and stray animals in accordance with local and state ordinances" and that "[f]or colonies not achieving attrition and posing active threats to the area in which they are residing, the AVMA does not oppose the consideration of euthanasia when conducted by qualified personnel, using appropriate humane methods as described in the AVMA Guidelines for the Euthanasia of Animals.". According to estimates from the Humane Society of the United States, the population of feral cats in the US ranges from 50 to 70 million. In contrast, the number of pet cats in the US stands at approximately 76 million.

The effectiveness of both trap-and-euthanise and TNR programmes is largely dependent upon controlling immigration of cats into cleared or controlled areas; where immigration of new cats is controlled, both techniques can be effective. However, where immigration is not controlled, culling is more effective. Comparisons of different techniques have also found that trap-and-euthanise programmes are half the cost of TNR ones. An analysis of both techniques in Hawaii suggested they are less effective when new cats were introduced by the abandonment of pets. The usefulness of TNR is disputed by some scientists and conservation specialists, who argue that TNR is only concerned with cat welfare and ignores the ongoing damage caused by feeding outdoor populations of neutered cats, including the depredation of wildlife, transmission of diseases, and the accumulation of cat faeces in the environment. Conservation scientists also question the effectiveness of TNR at controlling numbers of feral cats. Some studies that have supported TNR have also been criticised for using anecdotal data to evaluate their effectiveness.

In order for TNR to reduce the cat population, sterilisation rates of at least 75% must be maintained at all times, particularly because TNR practitioners providing cats with food makes the problem worse by increasing the survival rate of feral kittens. Also, this food source causes other cats to be drawn into the colony from outside. Members of the public often begin dumping unwanted pet cats at TNR sites, increasing the rate of recruitment. And neutered cats are less territorial, allowing for higher populations. TNR programs are sometimes able to attain local reductions in the numbers of cats at specific colony locations, but it has never been demonstrated to meaningfully impact cat populations over large areas or regions, because the effort necessary to maintain sufficient sterilisation rates means that systemic TNR will never be a credible option. For example, to reduce a typical Australian city's population of 700,000 feral cats through TNR would require sterilising at least 500,000 of them initially, and then continuing to sterilise more than 75% of the kittens that the other 200,000 would continue to produce each year indefinitely, along with all the new recruits from other cat populations drawn by the food supply.

TNR is backed by well-funded advocacy organizations: in 2010, Alley Cat Allies spent US$3 million advocating to legalise TNR throughout the United States, while the Best Friends Animal Society spent $11 million on a "Focus on Felines" initiative that included TNR advocacy. Promoters of TNR are often funded by big businesses with a commercial interest in selling cat food, such as pet food mills and the pet products retailer PetSmart. While TNR is a popular approach to resolving the over population problem, it is not a ubiquitously accepted method. Another perspective emphasizes the poor outdoor living conditions of feral cats and advocates for rehoming, adoption, or euthanasia as a more ethical response. This perspective centers the pressure feral cats place on the ecosystem, which is alternative to the popular position that centers the value of each cat's life.

=== TNR and wildlife ===
De-sexing cats, as in TNR programs, does nothing to prevent them from continuing to destroy wildlife. In Mandurah, Western Australia, a single, neutered, semi-feral cat raided a protected fairy tern colony on at least six nights in November 2018. It killed at least six breeding adult fairy terns; directly or indirectly killed at least 40 nestlings, and caused enough stress on the fairy tern colony that all 111 nests were abandoned; resulting in a complete breeding failure for the entire colony of threatened seabirds. The predation was documented by wildlife cameras, as well as by the presence of cat tracks, cat scat, decapitated fairy terns, and injured and missing fairy tern nestlings. Though the colony was surrounded by ultrasound generators intended to deter cats, the fairy tern colony might have been an irresistible target, and this particular cat was white and had a blue eye, traits commonly associated with deafness.

=== Management in sensitive environments ===
In sensitive environments, such as delicate ecosystems that have been degraded by feral cats, population management can be quite difficult. On isolated Pacific islands, trapping and removing the feral population too quickly can have adverse effects including booms in rodent and small reptile populations previously checked by the feral cat population. This new dynamic may prove to be more harmful, with further upstream effects on the ecosystem that were not predicted before removal of the feral cat population. With such a sensitive system to account for, solutions for population control will likely differ from case to case, and especially in different ecosystems where feral cats are to be controlled.

== Effects on wildlife ==
In the United States, free-ranging cats kill one to four billion birds and six to 22 billion mammals annually.

In Australia, domestic cats were introduced in the 1800s to settlements that had developed near gold mining sites and farms as a pest control strategy to decimate rabbits, mice, and rats. Feral cats kill on average one million reptiles each day. Feral cats in Australia kill over 1.5 billion native mammals, birds, reptiles and frogs, and 1.1 billion invertebrates each year. Predation by cats is a recognised threat to over 200 nationally threatened species, and 37 listed migratory species. They have contributed to the extinction of more than 20 Australian mammal species, including the pig-footed bandicoots, lesser bilby and broad-faced potoroo.

=== Impact on prey species ===
A cat aiming for a pigeon

Even well-fed domestic cats may hunt and kill, mainly catching small mammals such as rodents and lagomorphs, but also birds, reptiles, amphibians, fish, and invertebrates. Hunting by domestic cats contributes to the decline in the numbers of birds in urban areas. Feral cats can threaten native species with extinction, particularly on island ecosystems where native animals did not evolve alongside predators, especially ambush predators like cats. Controlling or eliminating the populations of the non-native cats can produce a rapid recovery in native animals.On Shidvar Island in the Persian Gulf, two-egg clutches became more common among white-cheeked terns (Sterna repressa) after the removal of feral cats, although other differences between years may also have contributed.

Native species such as the New Zealand kākāpō and the Australian bettong tend to be more ecologically vulnerable when faced with predation by cats due to a lack of an evolutionary response to predation. Feral cats have had a major impact on these native species and have played a leading role in the endangerment and extinction of many species. In Hawaii's remote, mountainous areas, they destroy the nests of seabirds including Newell's shearwater (Puffinus newelli) and the Hawaiian petrel (Pterodroma sandwichensis), amongst many other ground-nesting birds.

In agricultural settings, cats can be effective at keeping mouse and rat populations low, but only if rodent harborage locations (such as tall grass) are kept under control. While cats are effective at preventing rodent population explosions, they are not effective for eliminating pre-existing severe infestations. In systems where wildlife is threatened by both predation by rats and cats, there are concerns that controlling cats could increase predation by rats, due to rat populations increasing. For example, in Christmas Island, it was shown that decreasing cat populations would improve the growth rate of a threatened bird, as long as rats did not increase by more than 77 rats per cat removed.

== Hybridisation with wildcats ==
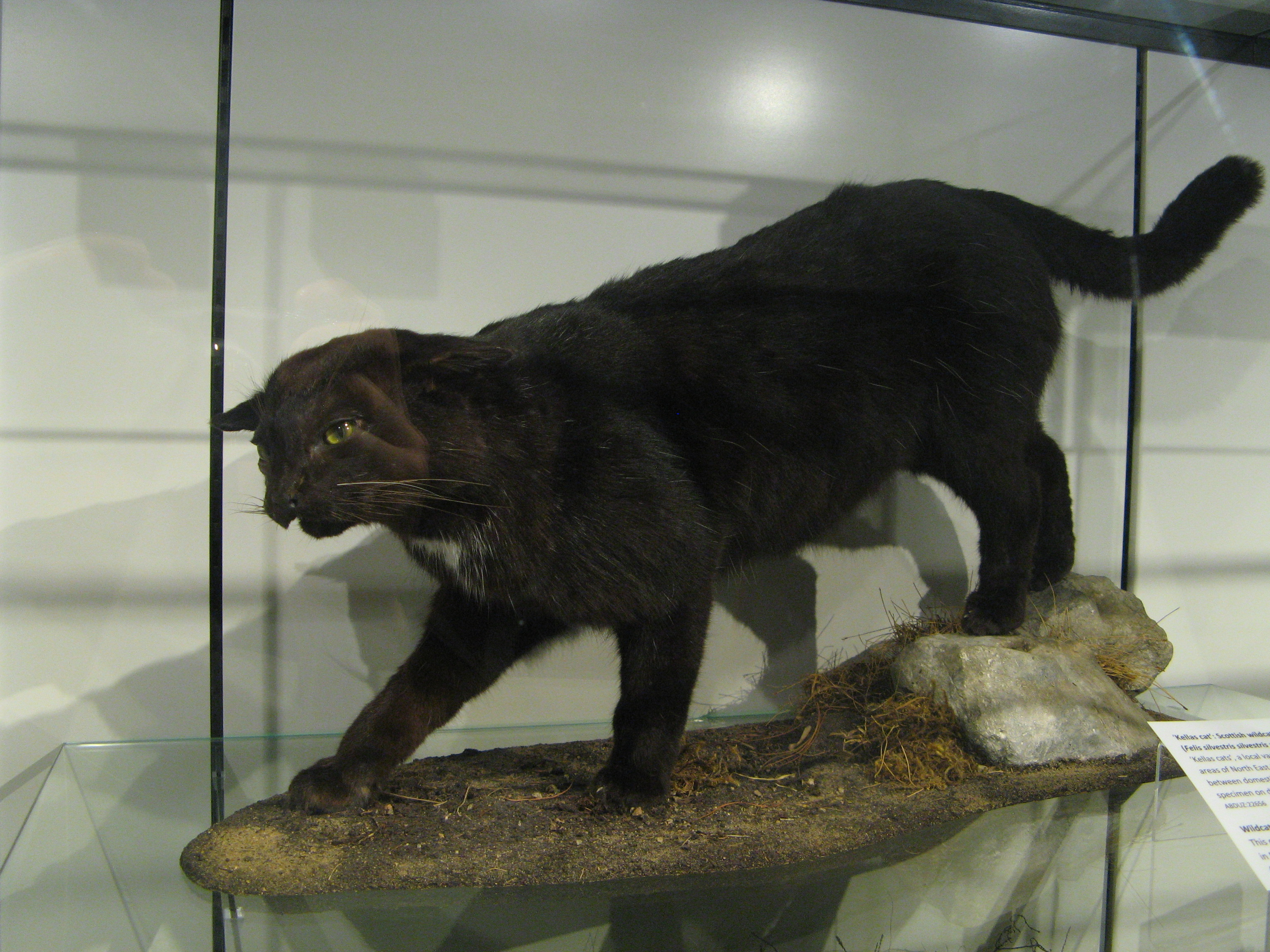
A Kellas cat, a landrace resulting from hybridisation between a domestic cat and a Scottish wildcat

Feral cats have interbred with wildcats to various extents throughout the world, a phenomenon first described more than 200 years ago. The significance of hybridisation remains uncertain. Modern genetic analysis revealed that the African wildcat is the ancestor of the domestic cat, and it is a subspecies of the African wildcat.

Pure Scottish wildcats are unlikely to exist, but the current wildcat population is distinct enough from domestic cats to be worth protecting. High levels of hybridisation have led to difficulties in distinguishing pure wildcats from feral and domestic cats, which can complicate conservation efforts. Trap-neuter-return programs have been established to prevent hybridisation.

Notable gene introgression into European wildcat populations exists also in Italy, Hungary, Spain and Portugal.

== See also ==
- Cats in New Zealand § Feral cats
