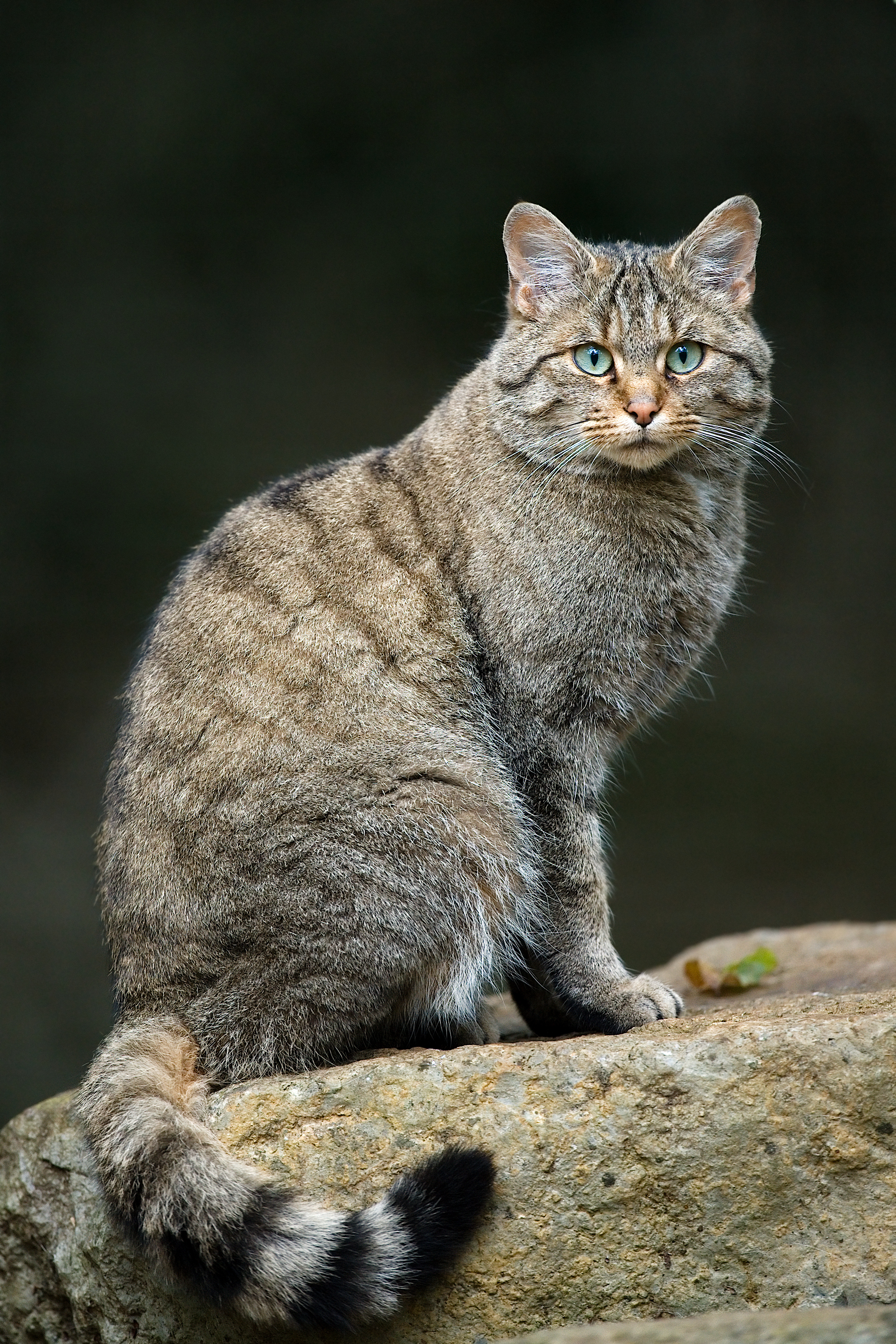

Conservation status
- Least Concern (IUCN 3.1)
- CITES Appendix II

Scientific classification
- Kingdom: Animalia
- Phylum: Chordata
- Class: Mammalia
- Order: Carnivora
- Family: Felidae
- Genus: Felis
- Species: F. silvestris

Binomial name
- Felis silvestris Schreber, 1777
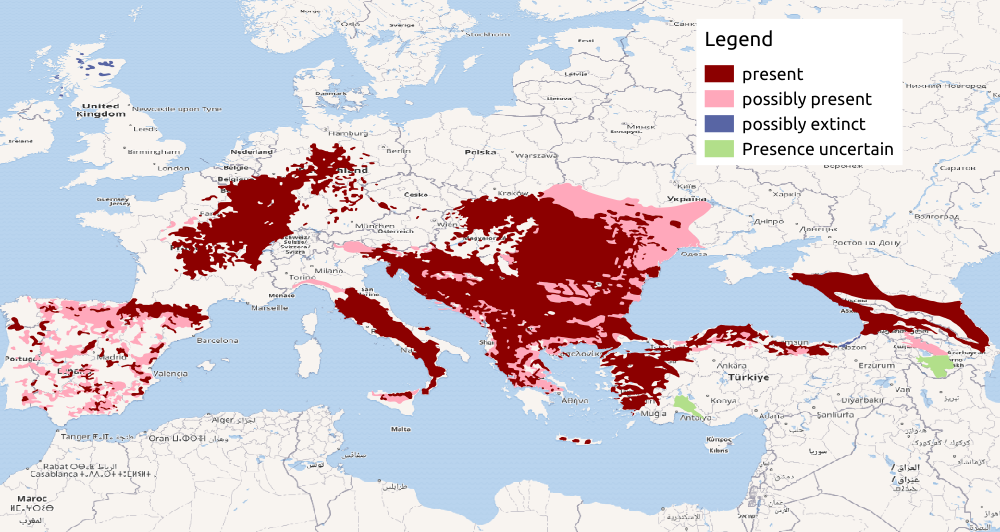
- Distribution of the European wildcat

= European wildcat =

European wildcat Temporal range: 173,000 years ago–present

Small wild cat

The European wildcat (Felis silvestris) is a small wildcat species that was described in the late 18th century. Its fur is brownish to grey with stripes on the forehead and on the sides. It has a bushy tail with a black tip. Its head-to-body length reaches up to 65 cm (26 in) with a 34.5 cm (13.6 in) long tail, and it weighs up to 7.5 kg (17 lb).

The European wildcat is native to continental Europe, Scotland, Turkey and the Caucasus. It primarily inhabits broad-leaved and mixed forests. In France and Italy, it is predominantly nocturnal, but also active in the daytime when undisturbed by human activities. It preys foremost on small mammals such as lagomorphs and rodents, but also on ground-dwelling birds.

== Taxonomy ==
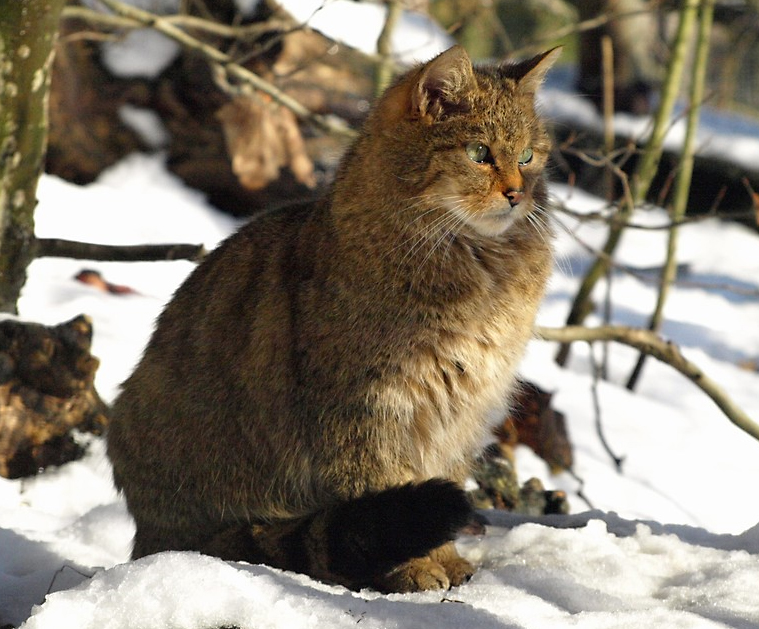
European wildcat in a zoo in Děčín, Czech Republic

Felis (catus) silvestris was the scientific name proposed in 1778 by Johann von Schreber when he described a wild cat based on texts from the early 18th century and before. In the 19th and 20th centuries, several wildcat type specimens were described and proposed as subspecies, including:

- Felis silvestris caucasica proposed by Konstantin Satunin in 1905 was a skin of a female cat collected near Borjomi in Georgia.
- Felis grampia proposed by Gerrit Smith Miller Jr. in 1907 was a skin and a skull of a male wildcat from Invermoriston in Scotland. Miller revised his classification in 1912, proposing Felis silvestris grampia after reviewing more wildcat skins from Scotland.
- Felis tartessia also proposed by Miller in 1907 was a skin and a skull of a male wildcat from Jerez de la Frontera in southern Spain. The wildcats north of the Douro and Ebro Rivers are said to be smaller than in the rest of the region. The disputed "Tartessian" wildcat has kept the same size and proportions as the form that was found in mainland Europe during the Pleistocene Ice Ages.

As of 2017, two subspecies are recognised as valid taxa:

- F. s. silvestris in continental Europe, Scotland and Sicily
- F. s. caucasica in Turkey and the Caucasus.

Zoological specimens of cats that originated on Mediterranean islands are not considered native but introduced, including:

- Felis lybica var sarda proposed in 1885 by Fernand Lataste was a skin and a skull of a male cat from Sarrabus in Sardinia.
- Felis reyi proposed in 1929 by Louis Lavauden who described a skin and a skull of a specimen from Biguglia.
- F. s. cretensis proposed in 1953 by Theodor Haltenorth who described two cat skins that were purchased in a bazaar in Chania.

== Phylogeny ==
Phylogenetic analysis of the nuclear DNA in tissue samples from all Felidae species revealed that the evolutionary radiation of the Felidae began in Asia in the Miocene around 14.45 to 8.38 million years ago. Analysis of mitochondrial DNA of all Felidae species indicates a radiation at around 16.76 to 6.46 million years ago.

The European wildcat is part of an evolutionary lineage that is estimated to have genetically diverged from the common ancestor of the Felis species around 1.62 to 0.59 million years ago, based on analysis of their nuclear DNA. Analysis of their mitochondrial DNA indicates a genetic divergence from Felis at around 4.14 to 0.02 million years ago. Both models agree in the jungle cat (F. chaus) having been the first Felis species that diverged, followed by the black-footed cat (F. nigripes), the sand cat (F. margarita), the African wildcat (F. lybica) and then the European wildcat.

Fossil remains of small wild cats found in Europe indicate that the European wildcat probably descended from Felis lunensis in the Villafranchian more than 1 million years ago, a transition that was completed by the Holstein interglacial about 340,000 to 325,000 years ago.

Phylogenetic relationships of the European wildcat as derived through analysis of

nuclear DNA:

- Felis
  - - - - - - Domestic cat (F. catus)
            - European wildcat
          - - African wildcat
            - Chinese mountain cat (F. bieti)
        - Sand cat
      - Black-footed cat
    - Jungle cat

mitochondrial DNA:

- Felis
  - - - - - African wildcat
            - - Domestic cat
              - Near Eastern wildcat
            - Asiatic wildcat (F. l. ornata)
            - Southern African wildcat (F. l. cafra)
        - European wildcat
      - Chinese mountain cat
    - Sand cat

== Characteristics ==
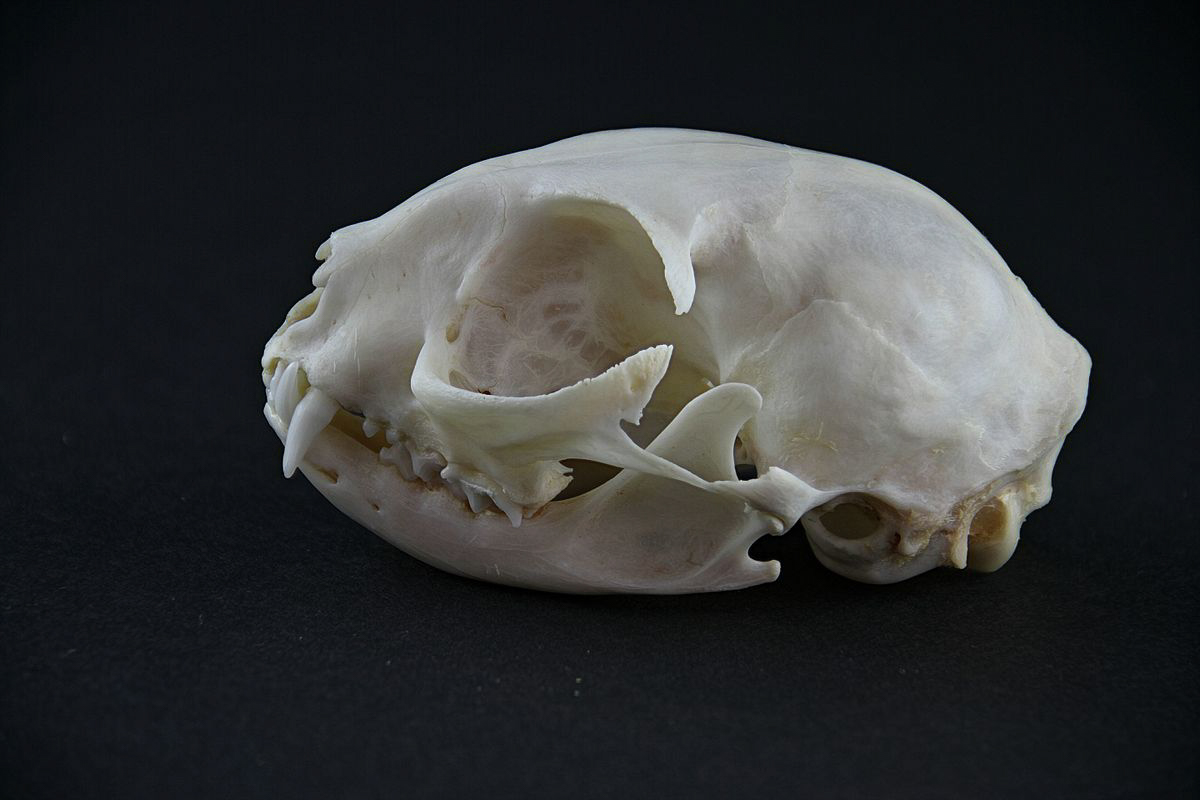
Skull of a European wildcat

The European wildcat's fur varies in colour from brownish to grey with paler contour hairs. It has five stripes on the forehead, which are broken up into small spots. A dark stripe behind the shoulders expands into a spinal stripe running up to the base of the tail. On the sides, it has irregular dark stripes, which break up on the hind legs, thus forming a blotched pattern. Its tail is bushy with two to three black, transverse rings and rounded at the black tip.

The top of the head and the forehead bear four well-developed dark bands that split into small spots. Two short and narrow stripes are usually present in the shoulder region, in front of the dorsal band. Some individuals have a few light spots on the throat, between the forelegs, or in the inguinal region. The dorsal surface of the neck and head are the same colour as that of the trunk, but is lighter grey around the eyes, lips, cheeks, and chin. A slight ochreous shade is visible on the undersides of the flanks.

A black and narrow dorsal band starts on the shoulders, and runs along the back up to the base of the tail. In some animals, the summer coat is ashen coloured. The patterns on the head and neck are as well-developed as those on the tail, though the patterns on the flanks are almost imperceptible. Guard hairs measure 7 cm (3 in), the tip hairs 5.5–6 cm (2 1/8–2 3/8 in), and the underfur 11–14 cm (4 1/2–5 1/2 in). Corresponding measurements in the summer are 5–6.7 cm (2–2 5/8 in), 4.5–6 cm (1 3/4–2 1/4 in), and 5.3 cm (2 1/8 in).

Large males in Spain reach 65 cm (26 in) in length, with a 34.5 cm (13 1/2 in) long tail, and weigh up to 7.5 kg (17 lb). They also have a less diffuse stripe pattern, proportionally larger teeth, and feed more often on rabbits than the wildcats north of the Douro-Ebro, which are more dependent on small rodents.

The European wildcat is on average bigger and stouter than the domestic cat, has longer fur and a shorter non-tapering bushy tail. It has striped fur and a dark dorsal band. Males average a weight of 5 kg (11 lb) up to 8 kg (18 lb), and females 3.5 kg (8 lb). Their weight fluctuates seasonally up to 2.5 kg (6 lb).

European wildcats have proportionately shorter cheek tooth rows with smaller teeth, but a broader muzzle than African wildcats. Since European wildcats and domestic cats opportunistically interbreed, it is difficult to distinguish wildcats and striped hybrids correctly on the basis of only morphological characteristics.

== Distribution and habitat ==
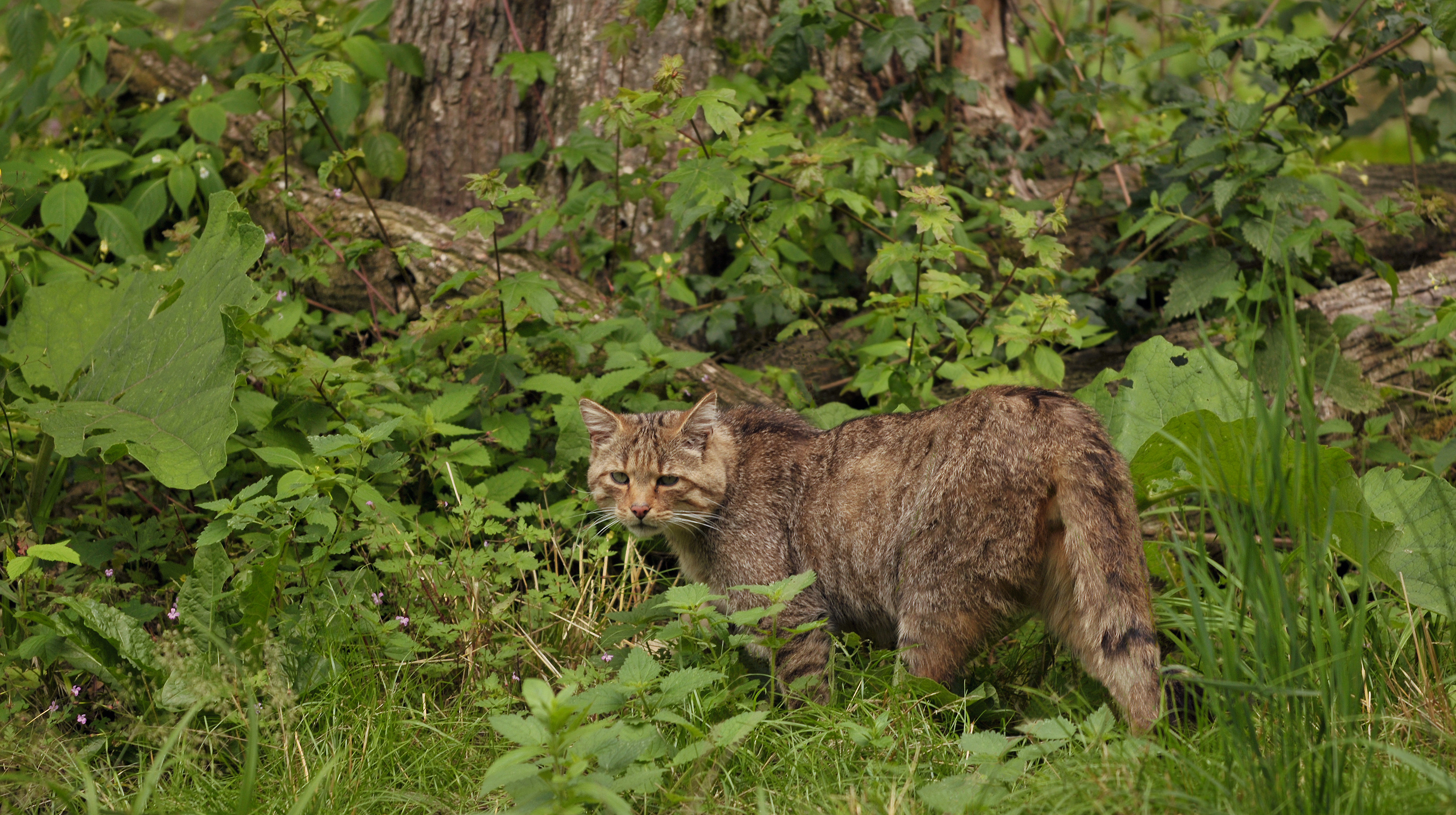
European wildcat in a German game park

The European wildcat lives primarily in broad-leaved and mixed forests. It avoids intensively cultivated areas and settlements. The northernmost population lives in northern and eastern Scotland. It has been extirpated in England and Wales. In Ireland, wildcats were first recorded in 3500 BC and died out by the 19th century AD due to deforestation and competition from domestic cats.

There are two disconnected populations in France. The one in the Ardennes in the country's north-east extends to Luxembourg, Germany and Belgium. The other in southern France may be connected via the Pyrenees to populations in Spain and Portugal.

In the Netherlands, European wildcats were recorded in 1999 near Nijmegen and in 2004 in North Brabant; these individuals had possibly dispersed from Germany. In early August 2026, a severely injured wildcat was found in southern Limburg, Netherlands; after rehabilitation, it was released nearby where it was found.

In Germany, the Rhine is a major barrier between the population in Eifel and Hunsrück mountains west of the river and populations east of the river, where a six-lane highway hampers dispersal. In 2025, an individual was observed in Schleswig-Holstein that had presumably crossed the Elbe river, which had been acting as a natural barrier to populations further north.

In Switzerland, European wildcats are present in the Jura Mountains. Three fragmented populations in Italy comprise one in the country's central and southern part, one in the eastern Alps that may be connected to populations in Slovenia and Croatia. The Sicilian population is the only Mediterranean insular population that has not been introduced.

The population in the Polish Carpathian Mountains extends to northern Slovakia and western Ukraine.

== Behaviour and ecology ==
In France and Italy, the European wildcat is active foremost at night; in undisturbed sites, it is also active by day.

In Sicily, an individual was photographed in 2009 and again in 2018 at about the same location. It was probably at least 10 years old at the time of recapture.

=== Hunting and diet ===
In Western Europe, the wildcat feeds on hamsters, brown rats, dormice, water voles, voles, and wood mice. From time to time, it also preys on small carnivores like martens, European polecat, stoat, and least weasel (Mustela nivalis), as well as fawns of red deer (Cervus elaphus), roe deer (Capreolus capreolus), and chamois (Rupicapra rupicapra). In the Carpathians, it feeds primarily on yellow-necked mouse (Apodemus flavicollis), northern red-backed vole (Clethrionomys rutilus), Tatra pine vole (Microtus tatricus), and occasionally also on European hare (Lepus europaeus). In Transcarpathia, its diet consists of mouse-like rodents, galliformes, and squirrels. In the Dnestr swamps, it preys on Microtus, water voles, and birds, while those living in the Prut swamps primarily target water vole, brown rat, and muskrat (Ondatra zibethicus).

Birds hunted by the European wildcat include warblers, ferruginous duck, Eurasian coot, spotted crake, and gadwall. In Moldavia, its winter diet consists primarily of rodents, while it preys on birds, fish, and crayfish in summer. Brown rats and water voles, as well as muskrats and waterfowl are its main food source in the Kuban River delta. In the northern Caucasus, it feeds on mouse-like rodents and European edible dormice, as well as birds, young chamois and roe deer on rare occasions. On the Black Sea coast, it is thought to feed on small birds, shrews, and hares. On one occasion, the feathers of a white-tailed eagle and the skull of a kid were found at a den site. In Transcaucasia, its diet consists of gerbils, voles, birds, and reptiles in the summer, and birds, mouse-like rodents, and hares in winter.

== Threats ==
In most European countries, European wildcats have become rare. Although legally protected, they are still shot by some people mistaking them for feral cats. In the Scottish Highlands, where approximately 400 were thought to remain in the wild in 2004, interbreeding with feral cats is a significant threat to the wild population's distinctiveness. The population in Portugal and Spain is also threatened by interbreeding with feral cats and loss of habitat. The extent of hybridization is low in Germany, Italy and Luxembourg.

In the 1990s, the easternmost population in Ukraine, Moldova, and the Caucasus was threatened by destruction of broad-leaved forests, entailing a reduction of their range. Only small numbers occur in protected areas.

== Conservation efforts ==
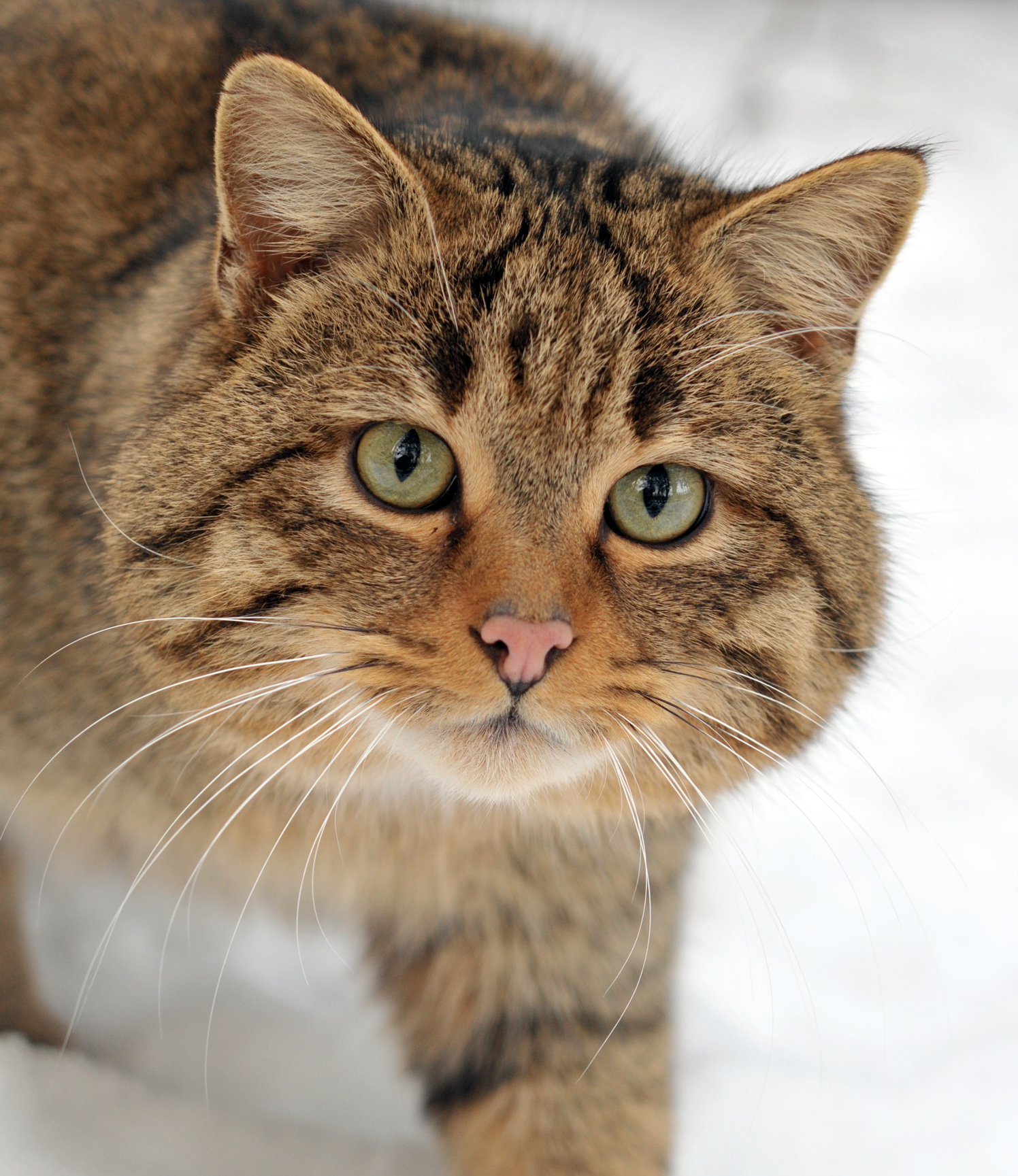
A closeup of a European wildcat in a German gamepark

The European wildcat is protected in most European range countries. It is listed in CITES Appendix II, in Appendix II of the Berne Convention on the Conservation of European Wildlife and Natural Habitats and in the European Union's Habitats and Species Directive.

=== Germany ===
In 2004, the Friends of the Earth Germany initiated the project "Safety Net for the European Wildcat". This project aimed at relinking Germany's forests by planting bushes and trees between areas inhabited by and suitable for European wildcat, and which are larger than 500 km^{2} (190 sq mi). They developed the "Wildcat Routing Map", a map depicting the 20,000 km (12,000 mi) long network of corridors. An Action Plan for the Protection of the European Wildcat in Germany was developed in 2009, aiming at doubling the area inhabited by European wildcat and linking populations within Germany and with neighbouring countries until 2019.

=== Scotland ===
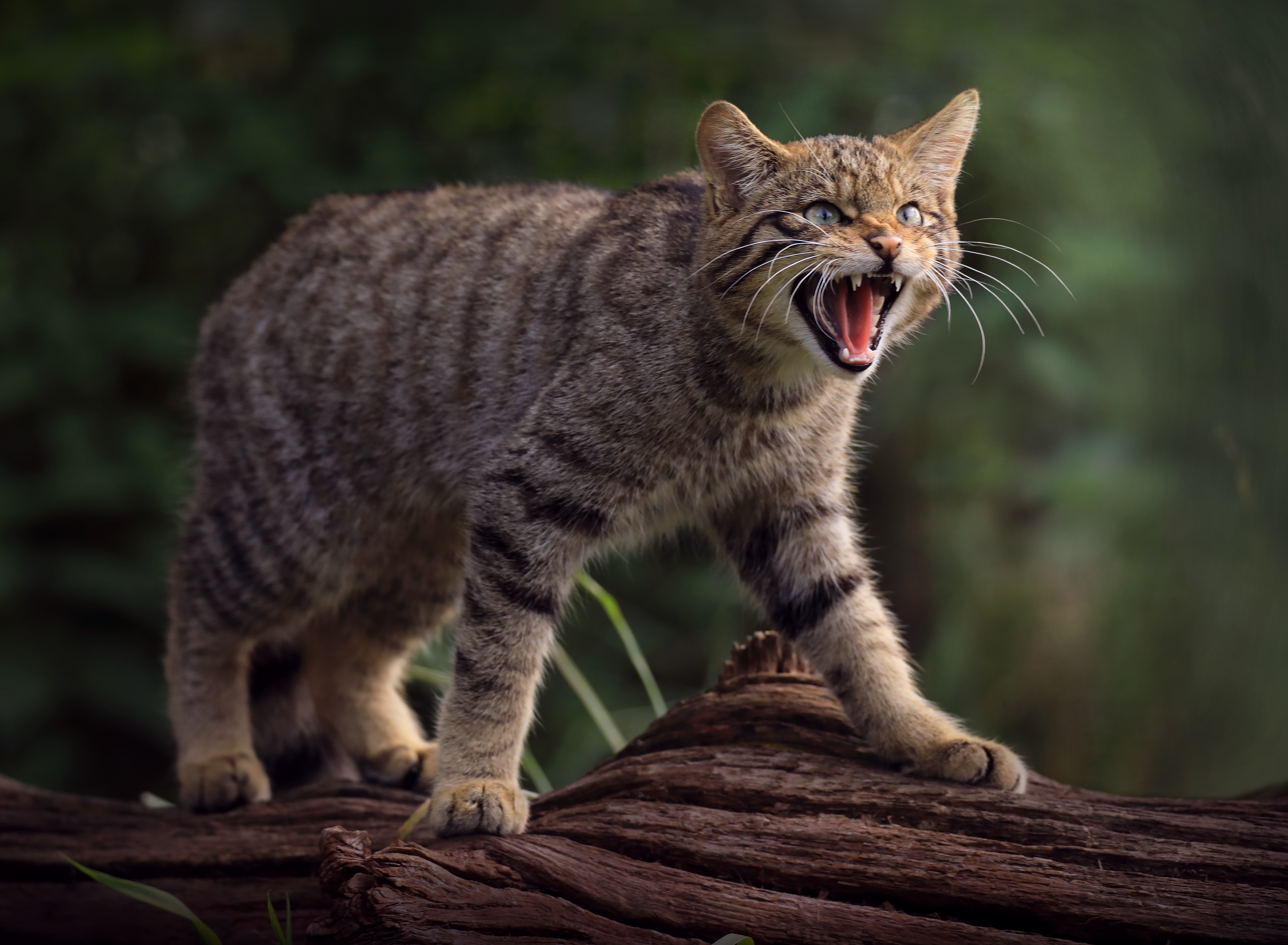
Scottish wildcat at the British Wildlife Centre

In 2013, the Scottish Wildcat Conservation Action Group developed the Scottish Wildcat Conservation Action Plan. With this plan, the group set national action priorities and defined responsibilities of agencies and funding priorities for conservation efforts between 2013 and 2019. Its implementation is coordinated by Scottish Natural Heritage (now NatureScot). The existing wild population has been deemed no longer viable without the implementation of conservation measures.

In 2023 a license was approved by NatureScot to release captive-bred wildcats into the Cairngorms region in June of that year. 19 cats were released in early June 2023, with a further 40 expected to follow in 2024 and 2025. In spring 2024, at least two of the cats released the previous year gave birth to kittens.

=== England ===
Conservationists plan to start a captive breeding programme in 2019 with the aim to reintroduce cats into the wild by 2022.

In 2023, it was announced that beginning in 2024 wildcats would be reintroduced in Devon and Cornwall for the first time in 500 years as part of a conservation project.

=== Switzerland ===
The European wildcat population has been protected since 1963. After a period of population decline, it appears to be increasing or stabilizing once again. It is unknown whether it was truly on the verge of extinction, if it has returned from France, or if it was reintroduced by private individuals or official services.

In the 21st century, it has appeared in new locations, such as the shores of Lake Neuchâtel. Its distribution and population size is assessed using hair traps: stakes coated with valerian are placed in potential habitats, and the collected hairs are sorted and analyzed. Out of 655 hair samples, 525 were from cats, including 136 from wild cats. Photos also contribute to the investigation, with 716 portraits, including 268 of wild cats or their look-alikes. These results highlight the challenge of close coexistence between populations of wild cats and domestic cats, and the resulting hybridization. It is estimated that 15 to 20% of Jura cats are hybrids.

=== France ===
In mainland France, the wildcat species used to be widespread from ancient times until the Middle Ages. However, its populations began to decline during that period. Although it almost disappeared in the 20th century, there has been a slow resurgence in recent years.

As of 2012, the presence of wildcats had been confirmed in 44 departments across metropolitan France. However, they are considered rare in nine of those departments. In the Vosges and Jura departments, they are slightly more commonly found. In mainland France, as of 2012, wildcats inhabited two distinct areas: the northeastern region of the country and the Pyrenean region. They are primarily observed in the foothills and can be found at altitudes of up to 1,700–1,800 metres (5,600–5,900 ft). This population extends further south into Spain and Portugal.

A small remaining population of wildcats is believed to survive in the Var department, particularly in the Esterel Massif. In 2022, there was a notable reappearance of wildcats in the Bauges Massif (Savoie department) after having been absent for a century.

=== In captivity ===
The European wildcat has the reputation for being effectively impossible to raise as a pet. Naturalist Frances Pitt wrote, "there was a time when I did not believe this ... my optimism was daunted" by trying to keep a wildcat she named Beelzebina.

== See also ==
- Kellas cat
