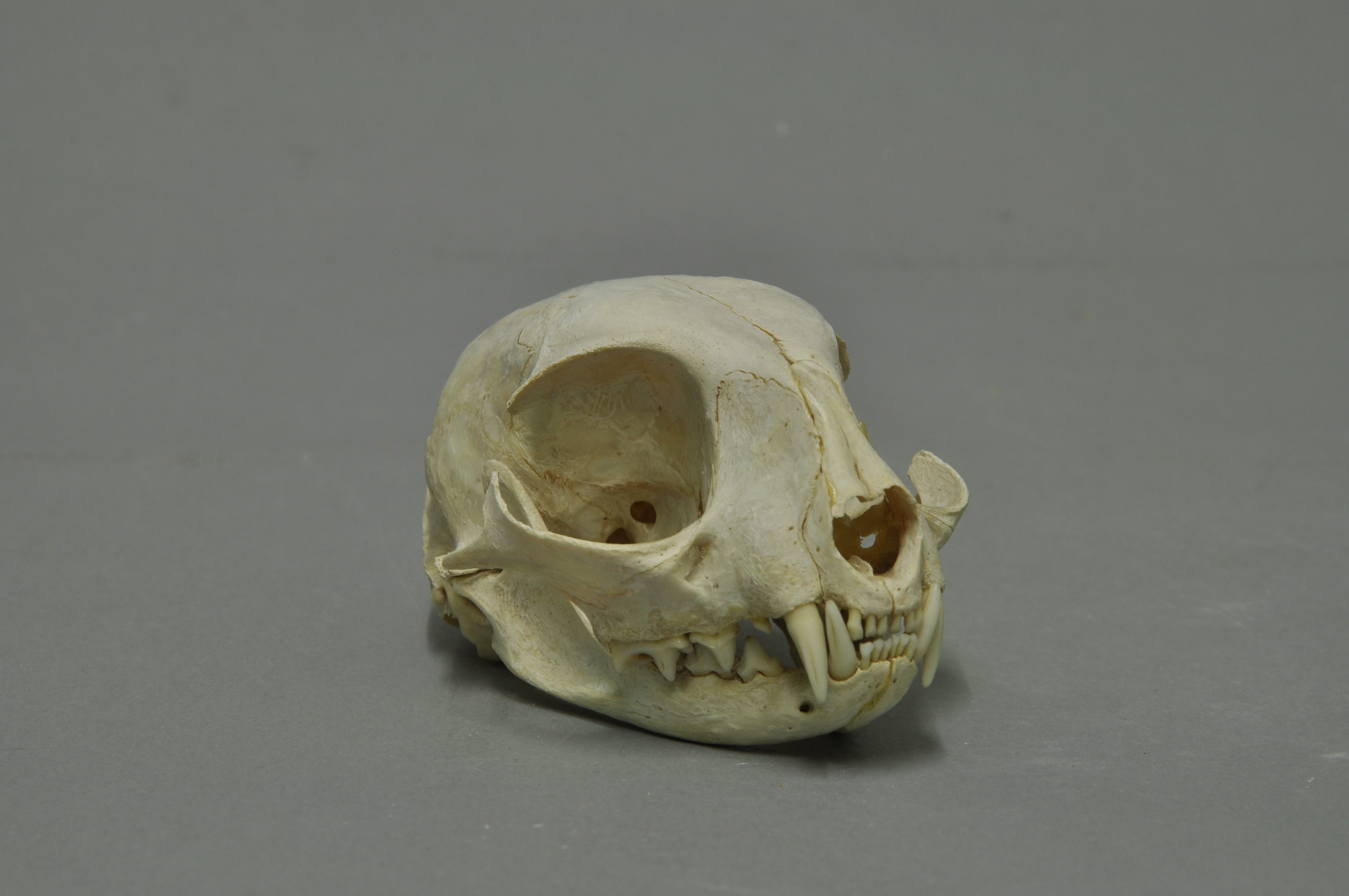
- Corsican wildcat skull

Scientific classification
- Kingdom: Animalia
- Phylum: Chordata
- Class: Mammalia
- Infraclass: Placentalia
- Order: Carnivora
- Family: Felidae
- Genus: Felis
- Species: F. catus

Binomial name
- Felis catus Linnaeus, 1758

Synonyms
- Felis lybica reyi

= Corsican wildcat =

Species of felid

The Corsican wildcat is an isolated cat population of uncertain taxonomic status that has been variously regarded as a separate species of its own (as Felis reyi), a subspecies of the African wildcat (as Felis lybica reyi), or a population of feral house cats (Felis catus) that were introduced to Corsica around the beginning of the first millennium.

In 2019, several newspapers reported on the supposed discovery of the Corsican wildcat as a previously unknown cat species, calling it "cat-fox" (Corsican: ghjattu-volpe). As of 2021, a description for this animal as a potential new species was being drafted, and other research was ongoing.

== History and taxonomy ==
In February 1929, M. Rey-Jouvin collected the skin and skull of a female wildcat from the Aunes forest at the border of the Étang de Biguglia. In that same year, it was examined and described by Louis Lavauden, who named it the holotype of the new species Felis reyi, the Corsican wildcat. The specific name reyi honored M. Rey-Jouvin.

It was provisionally suggested to be a synonym of Felis lybica sarda by Reginald Innes Pocock who reviewed Felis skins in the collection of the Natural History Museum, London, but he admitted to not being able to review any specimens from Corsica himself, and based his suggestion off of Lavauden's description.

Following zooarchaeological research in Corsica, it was regarded to have been introduced to the island during the Roman Empire, likely originating from domestic cat stock. As of 2017, it was no longer considered a valid species or subspecies.

In 2023, a population genomics study provided the first molecular evidence of the Corsican wildcat's uniqueness, using ddRADseq sequencing of 3,671 single nucleotide polymorphisms; the result revealed that the Corsican wildcat is genetically distinct from the European wildcat (Felis silvestris) and closer to the Sardinian wildcat than to the domestic cat (Felis catus) and that individuals exhibiting the Corsican phenotype form a genetically homogeneous unit.

== Description ==
The Corsican wildcat was described as being darker than the African wildcat with a shorter tail and dark brown on the backs of the ears.

Further description detailed that the Corsican wildcat is approximately 90 centimetres (35 in) from head to tail. The front legs are striped, the hind legs are very dark brown, and the stomach fur is russet; the whole of the coat is dense and silky. The tail is the most distinctive: ringed and black-tipped.

== In culture ==
The Corsican wildcat features in the local shepherds' folklore as forest cats who would attack the udders of their ewes and goats.

== See also ==
- Sardinian wildcat
- Cretan wildcat
