= Jacques Delamain =

French ornithologist

Jacques Delamain (10 September 1874, Jarnac – 5 February 1953, Saint-Brice, Charente) was a French naturalist who specialised in ornithology. He was, from 1929, on the editorial committee of Alauda, Revue internationale d'Ornithologie with its founder Paul Paris and Louis Lavauden, Noël Mayaud, Henri Heim de Balsac, Jacques de Chavigny, Henri Jouard and Paul Poty. Delamain's book Why Birds Sing (Pourqoui les oiseaux chantent) was published in French in 1928; an English translation by Ruth and Anna Sarason was published in 1932.

Delamain was an important influence on the French composer Olivier Messiaen. Messiaen shared Delamain's fascination with birds, and throughout his career integrated birdsong into his compositions. Messiaen visited Delamain at the latter's country home in April 1952. Delamain's guidance encouraged Messiaen to intensify and further systematize his transcription of birdsongs. In his 1960 preface to Why Birds Sing, Messiaen writes: "I had already, for a long time, devoted myself to noting more or less accurately the songs of birds, without knowing which of them I was writing down...It is [Delamain] who taught me to recognise a bird from its song, without having to see its plumage or the shape of its beak. Or its flight, so that I no longer mistook a blackcap for a chaffinch or a garden warbler!" Messiaen's work Réveil des oiseaux (Awakening of the birds), first performed in 1953, is dedicated to Delamain's memory.
