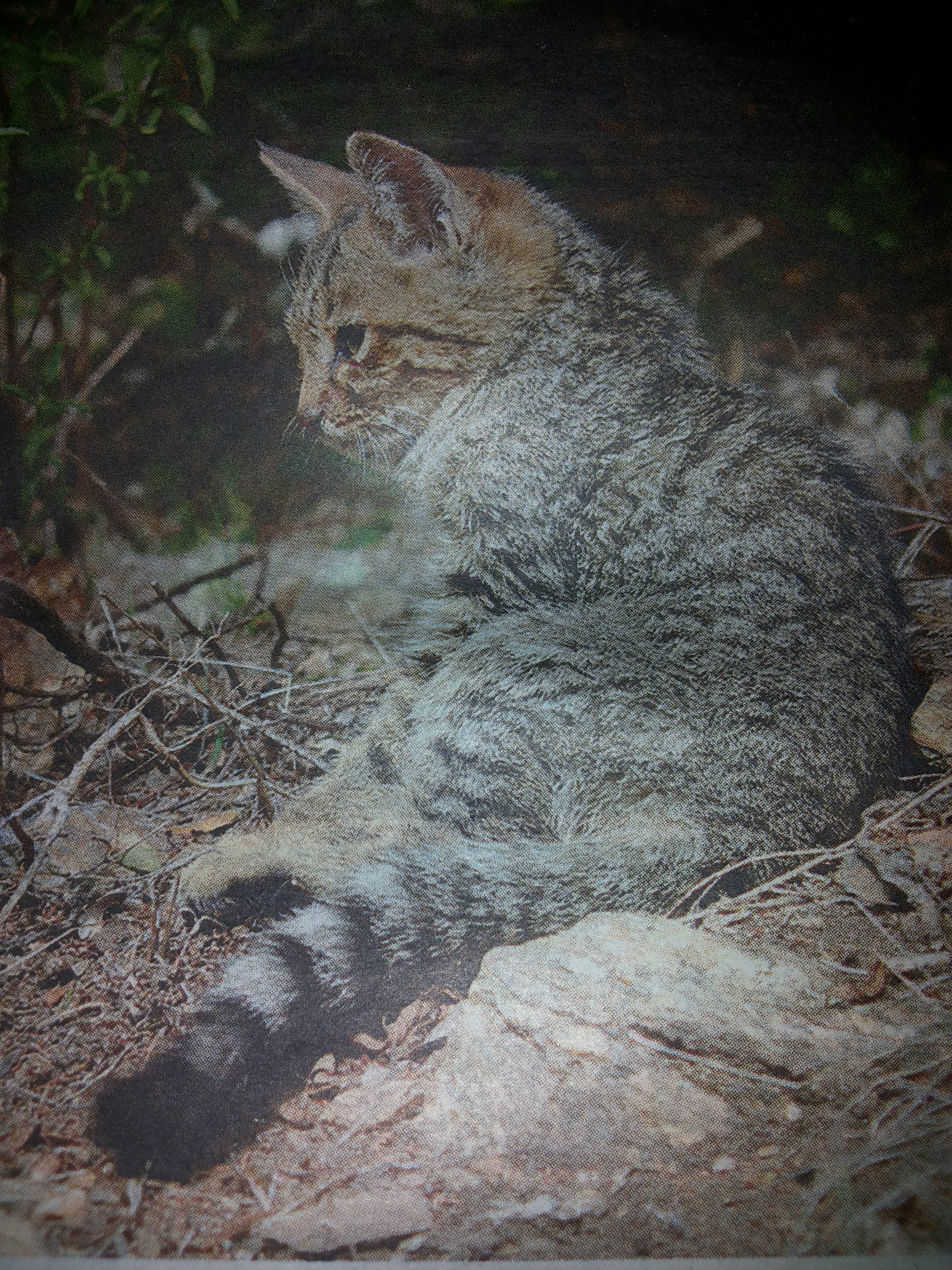
- Sardinian wildcat in Villagrande Strisaili

Scientific classification
- Kingdom: Animalia
- Phylum: Chordata
- Class: Mammalia
- Infraclass: Placentalia
- Order: Carnivora
- Family: Felidae
- Genus: Felis
- Species: F. lybica
- Subspecies: F. l. lybica
- Population: Sardinian wildcat

Synonyms
- Felis silvestris sarda Lataste, 1885; Lynx lynx sardiniae Mola, 1908; Felis lybica sarda; Felis silvestris lybica var. sarda (Mura et al., 2013)

= Sardinian wildcat =

Feral cat in Sardinia

The Sardinian wildcat is a population of the African wildcat (Felis lybica lybica) on the island of Sardinia. Results of genetic analysis of cat samples from the Mediterranean region indicates that it was introduced at least 2200 years ago from northwestern Africa. It is protected under the legislation of the Sardinian Autonomous Region, the Berne Convention, and the Habitats Directive.

== Taxonomy ==
Felis libyca var sarda was the scientific name proposed for this cat in 1885 by Fernand Lataste, who described a skin and skull of a male cat from Sarrabus in Sardinia, which resembled an African wildcat but was more reddish, grey and brown, and with longer hairs on the back. In 1896, Giacinto Martorelli considered it as a subspecies of Felis mediterranea. In 1910, Édouard Louis Trouessart proposed the name Felis ocreate sarda. In 1912, Gerrit Smith Miller Jr. considered it to be a species using the name Felis sarda for 16 zoological specimens that he had examined.

The Sardinian lynx with the scientific name Lynx lynx sardiniae was proposed by the Italian biologist Pasquale Mola in 1908 for two zoological specimens from Nuoro in Sardinia that were part of the zoological collection of the University of Sassari. These specimens were reassessed in 1911 by Alessandro Ghigi who identified them as Sardinian wildcats. Gighi's assessment was corroborated in 1981 by an Italian biologist who examined the still available mounted specimens initially described by Mola.

The scientific name Felis silvestris lybica var. sarda, using an outdated name for the African wildcat, was proposed in 2013.

== Phylogeography ==
Results of zooarchaeological research in the early 1990s indicated that the Sardinian wildcat descended from the domestic cat (Felis catus) that was introduced around the beginning of the first millennium during the Roman Empire and probably originated in the Near East.

Molecular analysis of cat samples from the Mediterranean region revealed that the Sardinian wildcat forms a genetic cluster with African wildcat samples from northwestern Africa; the oldest cat in this cluster has been radiocarbon dated 200 years Before the Common Era and was found at an archaeological site near Genoni. Three Sardinian cat samples in this dataset date from Roman to 19th century and cluster with modern domestic cats, indicating that domestic cats were introduced later, probably from the first century onwards.

== Description ==
The Sardinian wildcat is typically ash grey or yellow-grey in colour. Its fur is striped in a tabby pattern, with parallel head stripes that merge into a long dorsal stripe that runs until the tail, from which lateral stripes branch off and merge into the lighter fur of the belly. Its head is rounded, with a flattened muzzle and distinctive ear tufts. It reaches 70 cm (28 in) of head-body length and has a more robust build than the domestic cat. Its tail is roughly half the length of the body.

The specimens described by Mola had a long and dense fulvous fur on the back and were whitish on the belly. Their body length was 50 cm (20 in) with a 25 cm (9.8 in) long tail and a shoulder height of 35 cm (14 in).

== Behaviour and ecology ==
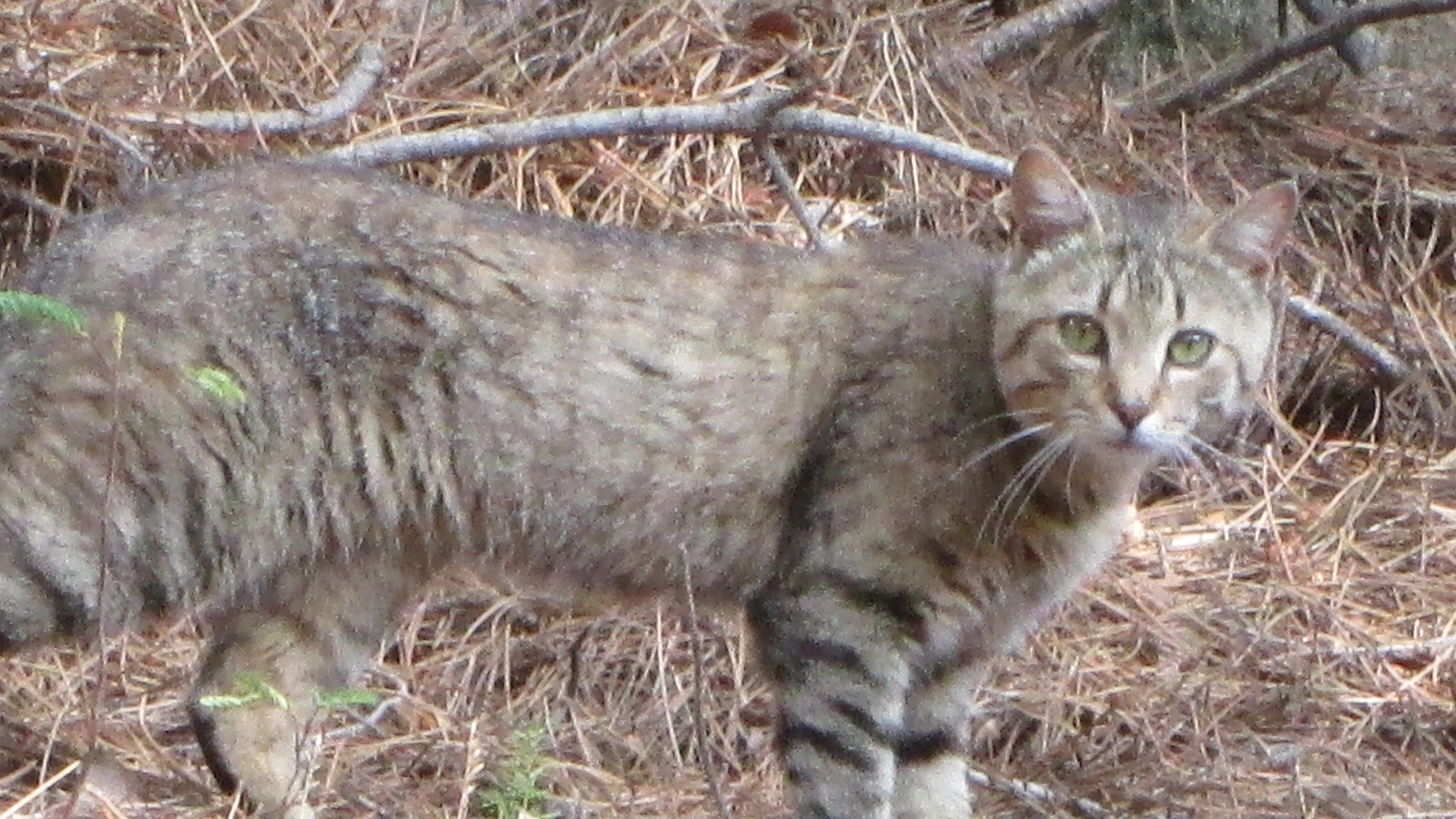
Sardinian wildcat in its environment, Mediterranean coastal forest

The Sardinian wildcat inhabits montane forests in the interior of the island, favoring maquis, holly oak woods, and other deciduous woodlands with dense undergrowth, as well as rocky valleys and montane areas. It is chiefly crepuscular, and typically spends the night and day hours in cover. Mating occurs in February and March; after a pregnancy of eight to nine weeks, two to six kittens are born between April and June, which become independent after three months.

=== Hunting and prey ===
The Sardinian wildcat feeds primarily on small forest-dwelling rodents, alongside passeriforms, reptiles, and amphibians. The most common rodent prey are the wood mouse, the European edible dormouse, and the garden dormouse. In areas where these are abundant, it is also known to take larger prey, such as the Barbary partridge, European hare, and European rabbit.

== Threats and conservation ==
The primary threats to the Sardinian wildcat are habitat fragmentation, poaching, and genetic pollution due to hybridisation with the domestic cat.

The Sardinian wildcat is protected under the legislation of the Sardinian Autonomous Region, the Berne Convention, and the Habitats Directive.

== See also ==
- Corsican wildcat
- Cretan wildcat
