= Paul Poty =

French naturalist (1889–1962)

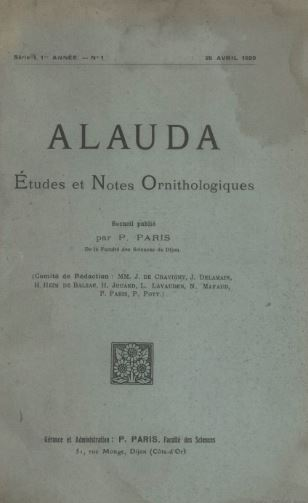
the first issue of Alauda

Paul Louis Poty (30 August 1889, Chagny, Saône-et-Loire- 10 February 1962, Louhans ) was a French naturalist who specialised in ornithology. He was, from 1929, on the editorial committee of Alauda, Revue internationale d'Ornithologie fr:Alauda, Revue internationale d'Ornithologie with its founder Paul Paris and Louis Lavauden, Noël Mayaud, Henri Heim de Balsac, Jacques de Chavigny, Henri Jouard and Jacques Delamain. He was a physician.
