= Caucasian wildcat =

Scientific classification
- Kingdom: Animalia
- Phylum: Chordata
- Class: Mammalia
- Order: Carnivora
- Family: Felidae
- Genus: Felis
- Species: F. silvestris
- Subspecies: F. s. caucasica

Trinomial name
- Felis silvestris caucasica Satunin, 1905
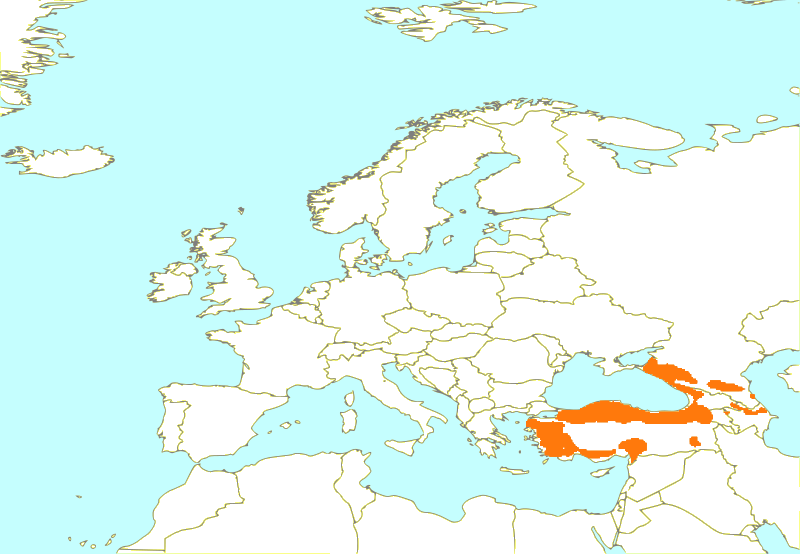

Synonyms
- F. s. trapezia Blackler, 1916

Subspecies of carnivore

The Caucasian wildcat (Felis silvestris caucasica) is a subspecies of European wildcat that inhabits the Caucasus Mountains and Turkey.

== Taxonomy ==
Felis silvestris caucasica was described by Konstantin Satunin in 1905 on the basis of a skin of a female cat collected near Borjomi in Georgia.

Felis silvestris trapezia was proposed in 1916 for a male zoological specimen in the collection of the Natural History Museum, London, which originated in the vicinity of Trabzon in northern Turkey.

== Characteristics ==
The Caucasian wildcat differs from the European wildcat by being lighter gray in colour, with a fainter pattern on the sides and the tail. It is similar in size, measuring 70–75 cm (28–30 in) in head to body length, 26–28 cm (10–11 in) in shoulder height. It weighs 5.2–6 kg (11–13 lb), rarely more than 8 kg (18 lb).

== Distribution and habitat ==
In Turkey, the wildcat is considered common in mesic and mixed oak-beech forests of the Pontic Mountains, but rare in the Marmara and Aegean Sea regions. In the Taurus Mountains, it probably only occurs in deciduous forest of Kahramanmaraş Province. It is possibly extinct in the Eastern Anatolia region.

== See also ==
- Caucasian black cat
