= Noël Mayaud =

French ornithologist

Noël Mayaud (25 November 1899, Saumur - 2 May 1989, Saumur) was a French naturalist who specialised in ornithology. He was, from 1929, on the editorial committee of Alauda, Revue internationale d'Ornithologie fr:Alauda, Revue internationale d'Ornithologie with its founder Paul Paris and Louis Lavauden, Henri Heim de Balsac, Jacques de Chavigny, Henri Jouard, Jacques Delamain and Paul Poty.
