= Paul Paris =

French naturalist & zoologist (1875-1938)

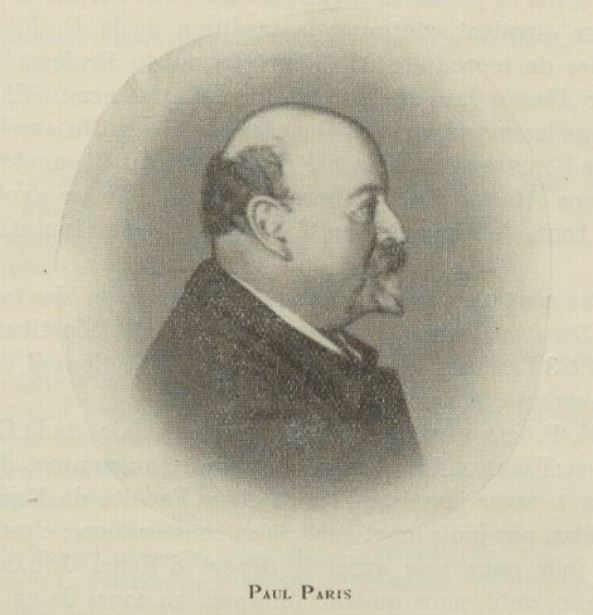
Paul Paris (1875-1938).

Jean Ferdinand Paul Paris (16 August 1875 – 2 May 1938) was a French naturalist and zoologist who specialised in ornithology. He was, in 1929, the founder of Alauda, Revue internationale d'Ornithologie and served as professor of zoology at the University of Burgundy from 1934.

== Biography ==
Paul Paris was born in Chaumont and was educated at the Université de Bourgogne where he graduated in 1901 and worked as a specimen preparator. He studied under the physiologist Clément Léger Nicolas Jobert (1840–1910) but had a nervous breakdown. He did not recover until 1921 when he edited the second volume of The Fauna of France. In 1922 he began to lecture in zoology and succeeded Marie Eugène Edmond Hesse in 1934. In 1929 he founded the journal Alauda. On the editorial committee were Noël Mayaud, Henri Heim de Balsac, Jacques de Chavigny, Jacques Delamain, Henri Jouard, Louis Lavauden, and Paul Poty. He became a curator of the natural history museum in Dijon where he also managed a salmon farm at the Jardin botanique de l'Arquebuse. He took an interest in aquatic fauna.

A subspecies the coal tit Parus ater parisi was described by Jouard in 1928 and a subspecies of treecreeper Certhia brachydactyla parisi also by Jouard in 1929 but these are both treated as a synonyms of their nominate subspecies.
