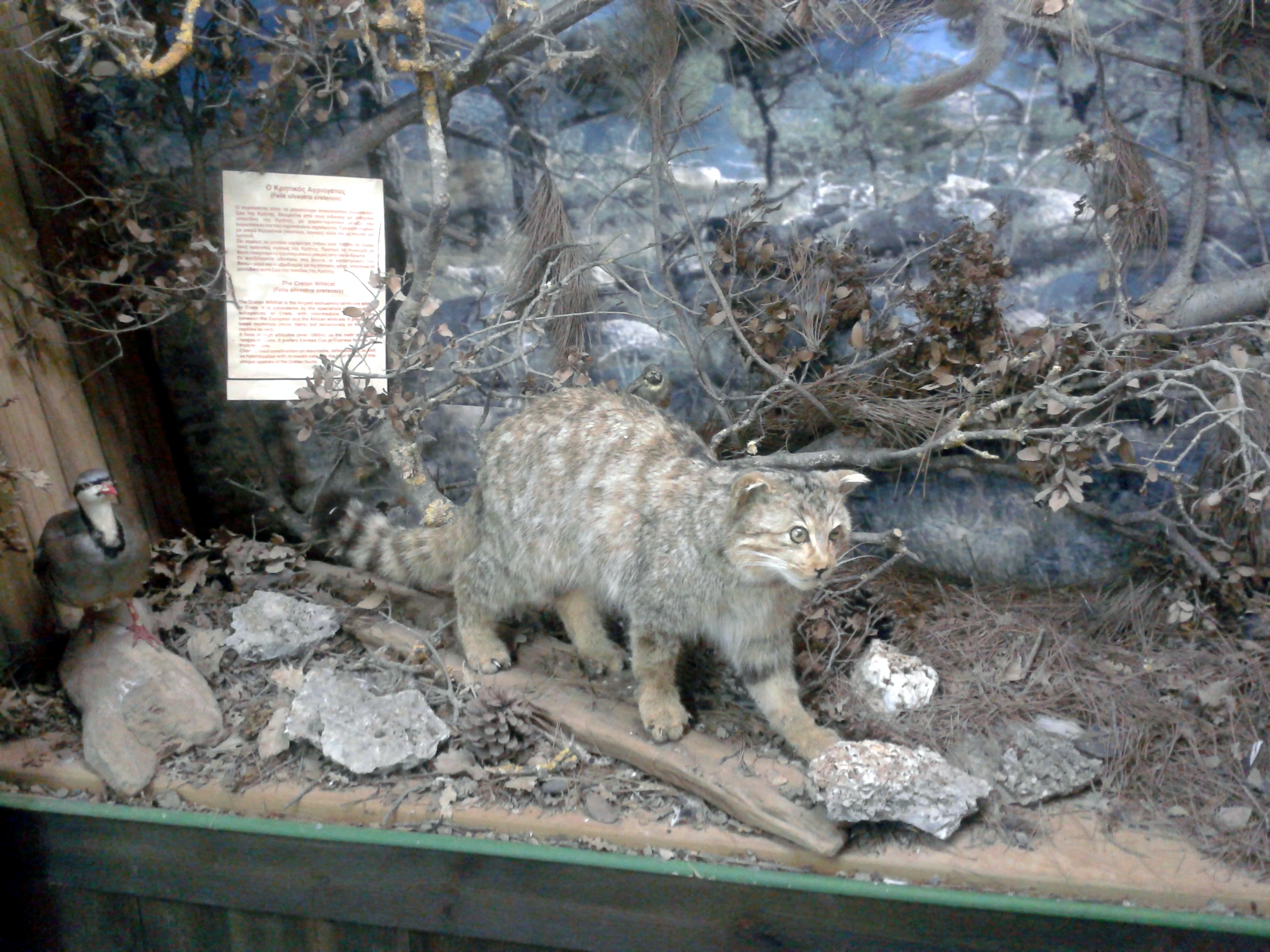
- Taxidermied specimen in the Natural History Museum of Mount Diktis, Vidianis Monastery, Lassithi plateau, Crete.

Scientific classification
- Kingdom: Animalia
- Phylum: Chordata
- Class: Mammalia
- Infraclass: Placentalia
- Order: Carnivora
- Family: Felidae
- Genus: Felis
- Species: F. silvestris
- Subspecies: F. s. silvestris

Trinomial name
- Felis silvestris silvestris T. Haltenorth, 1953

Synonyms
- Felis ocreata agrius Bate, 1906; Felis agrius (Miller, 1912); Felis silvestris cretensis Haltenorth, 1953; Felis lybica cretensis

= Cretan wildcat =

Cat hybrid or subspecies

The Cretan wildcat is a member of the genus Felis that inhabits the Greek island of Crete. Its taxonomic status is unclear at present, as some biologists consider it probably introduced, or a European wildcat (Felis silvestris silvestris), or a hybrid between European wildcat and domestic cat (F. catus). It was previously considered a separate subspecies of wildcat as Felis silvestris cretensis.

Crete has been isolated from the continent for about 6 million years. Palaeontological data indicate that the island was colonised during the Pleistocene by those mammalian taxa that were able to swim across the sea. Crete's Pleistocene endemic mammalian fauna comprised rodents and herbivores, but remains of predators were not found. Pleistocene mammals died out before the Holocene. More than 9,000 animal bones were excavated at the archaeological site Kavousi Kastro in eastern Crete in the late 1980s that date to the Late Geometric period at about 8th century BC. These faunal remains also included one cat that was identified as a domestic cat. Fragments of a domestic cat were also found at the archaeological site Gortyn dating to the 6th to 7th century AD.

In October 2017, Greek news sites circulated reports that a sheep farmer captured a wild cat after laying traps for a predator that attacked young sheep of his herd. The reports were accompanied by photographs and video footage of the captured animal.

== Taxonomic history ==
The Cretan wildcat was originally described as a wildcat subspecies Felis ocreata agrius by Dorothea Bate in 1905. This was contested by Pocock in 1907, who argued that the skin was that of a feral domestic cat, but Miller in 1912 considered it a species as Felis agrius. Pocock examined the type specimen and again declared it a feral cat.

In 1953, the name Felis silvestris cretensis was proposed by Theodor Haltenorth for a separate specimen, a skin collected at the same time as the F. agrius specimen, describing the second skin as resembling the skin of an African wildcat but with the bushy tail of a European wildcat. Later researchers considered it a subspecies of the African wildcat as Felis lybica cretensis.

In the 1980s, Colin Groves measured and assessed zoological specimens of cats that originated in the Mediterranean islands. He concluded that the two cat skins from Crete differed from true wildcat specimens and therefore considered them feral cats. This view was provisionally followed by the IUCN Cat Specialist Group's 2017 taxonomic review of the Felidae.

== See also ==
- Corsican wildcat
- Sardinian wildcat
