= Henri Jouard =

French ornithologist

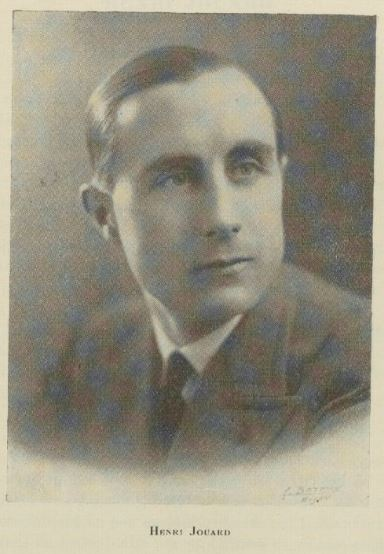
Henri Louis Ernest Jouard (1896–1938)

Henri Louis Ernest Jouard (16 May 1896, Santenay, Département Côte-d’Or; – 16 March 1938, Vence, Département Alpes-Maritimes) was a French lawyer and World War I soldier who was also an ornithologist. He was, from 1929, on the editorial committee of Alauda, Revue internationale d'Ornithologie fr:Alauda, Revue internationale d'Ornithologie with its founder Paul Paris and Louis Lavauden, Noël Mayaud, Henri Heim de Balsac, Jacques de Chavigny, Jacques Delamain and Paul Poty.

== Life and work ==
Jouard went to school at the École alsacienne in Paris, and later at the Gymnasium Carnot in Dijon, studying art and philosophy. He then studied law in Paris from 1914 but was interrupted when the First World War broke out. He was conscripted and from April 1915 he served in the 35th regiment of infantry. He then became a sergeant and moved to the 42nd regiment of infantry. He was wounded at Fort Vaux in 1916 and after recovery, he was posted at Buffle in 1917 where he escaped narrowly by hiding in a trench. In 1918 he was wounded in the lung during the Battle of the Mill of Laffaux. He infiltrated the German lines and persuaded the German soldiers to give up their resistance. When the 42nd regiment captured the area, he was found seriously injured along with German prisoners. He was awarded the Officier de la Légion d'honneur and the Croix de Guerre in 1932. He left the army and resumed his studies and received his law doctorate. He then practiced as a lawyer with the Dijon Bar Association.

Jouard became interested in birds as a child and was influenced by Henri Davriot Albertier of Beaune, a family friend. He became interested in the birds of the mountain regions and was especially interested in bird songs and calls. He used the term Ornithomélographie for the study of bird song. He wrote numerous articles on birds and attempted to influence Boy Scouts to take up bird study and protection. He was the first editor of the journal Alauda started in 1929 by Paul Paris, Jouard and others.
