= Caucasian black cat =

Feral or wildcat population in the Caucasus region

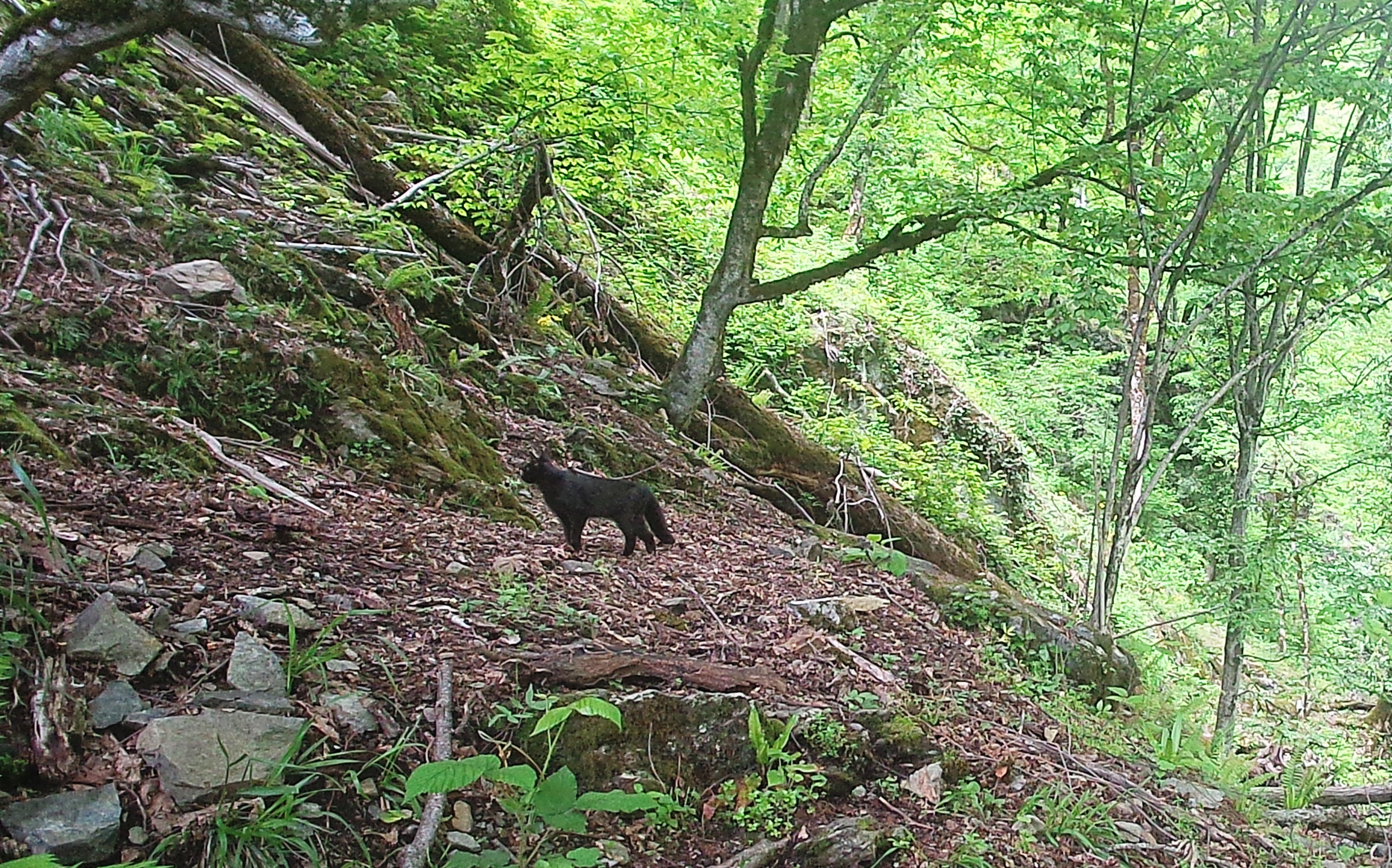
A Caucasian wildcat exhibiting melanism, Caucasian black cats are believed by some authors to have some degree of wildcat ancestry.

The Caucasian black cat is a population of feral cat, Caucasian wildcat, or a hybrid between the two.

== Taxonomy ==
The Caucasian black cat was described in 1837 by Rudolph Friedrich Hohenacker, who proposed the trinomial name Felis cato affinis. Konstantin Satunin proposed the new name Felis daemon in 1904, assuming that Hohenacker was not proposing a scientific name as the latter's work was written in Latin.

There are three hypotheses as to what the Caucasian black cat's identity actually is:

1. This population is a melanistic form of the Caucasian wildcat
2. The Caucasian black cat is a feral population of domestic cats
3. These cats are a hybrid between the two, similar to the Kellas cat of Scotland

== Range ==
The cat was found south of the Caucasus, being spotted in Armenia and Azerbaijan.

== See also ==
- Kellas cat
