= Jacques de Chavigny =

French naturalist (1880-1963)

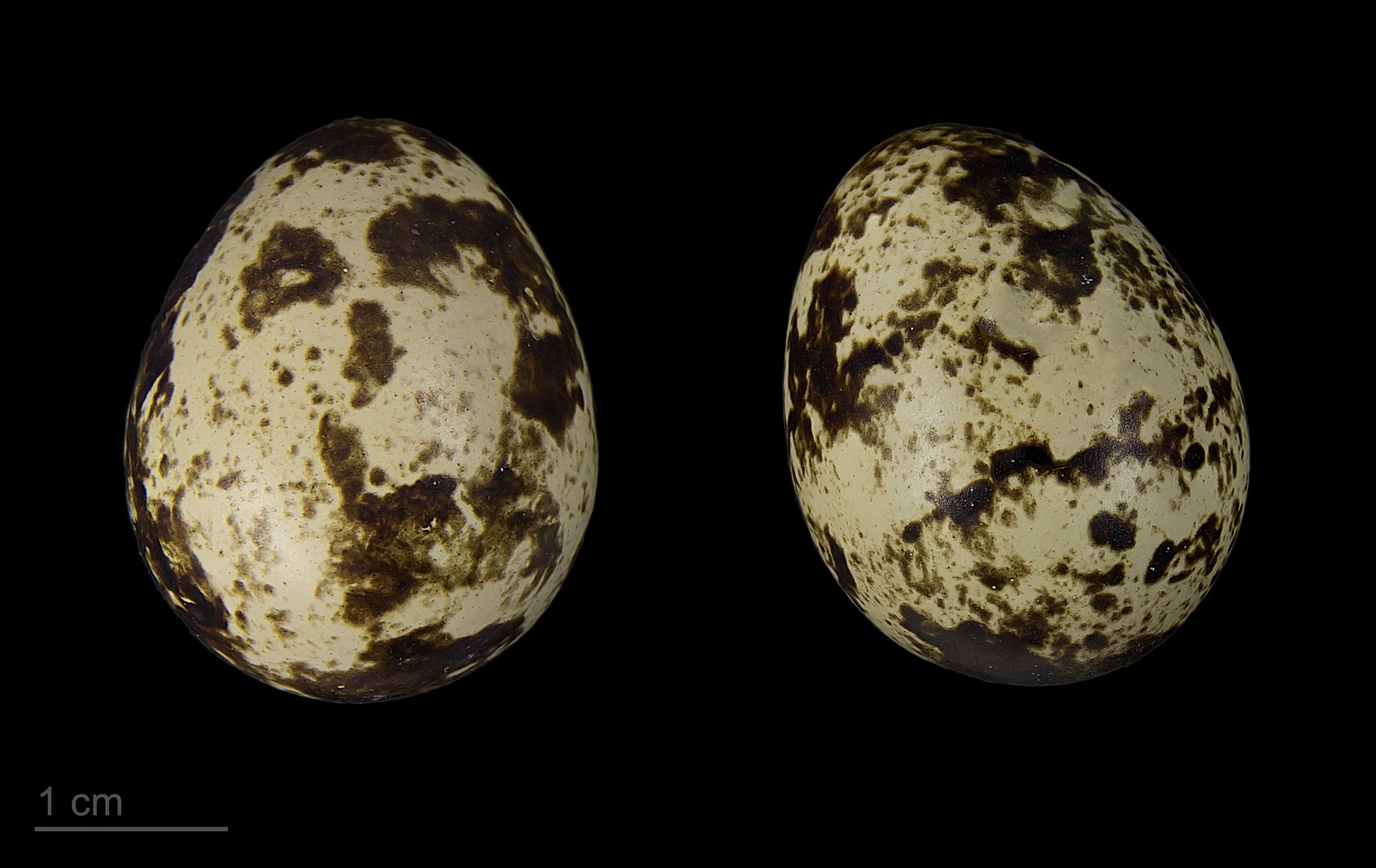
Coturnix coturnix eggs collected by Jacques de Chavigny

Jacques de Chavigny (7 January 1880- 4 May 1963) was a French naturalist who specialised in ornithology and oology. He was, from 1929, on the editorial committee of Alauda, Revue internationale d'Ornithologie fr:Alauda, Revue internationale d'Ornithologie with its founder Paul Paris and Louis Lavauden, Noël Mayaud, Henri Heim de Balsac, Henri Jouard, Jacques Delamain and Paul Poty.
