= Henri Heim de Balsac =

French zoologist (1899–1979)

- Born: 1 January 1899; Paris
- Died: 28 November 1979 (aged 80); Aubervilliers, France
- Scientific career
- Fields: Zoology

Henri Heim de Balsac (1 January 1899 – 28 November 1979) was a French zoologist.

In 1937 Henri Heim de Balsac was awarded the Prix Savigny de l'Académie des sciences. In the following year, 1938, he was awarded the Prix Gadeau de Kerville de la Société zoologique de France and he became a Council Member of the Société zoologique de France in February, 1938. He became a Corresponding Member of the Hungarian Institute for Ornithology and he was also responsible for the foundation of l’Institut chérifien de recherche scientifique (Maroc)fr:Institut scientifique de Rabat.

Henri Heim de Balsac worked on ethology (l’écoéthologie des Campagnols des champs), biological indicators, hydrobiology and the Chiroptera of France.

He was, from 1929, on the editorial committee of Alauda, Revue internationale d’ornithologie (on French Wikipedia) with its founder Paul Paris and Louis Lavauden, Noël Mayaud, Jacques de Chavigny, Henri Jouard, Jacques Delamain and Paul Poty.

== See also ==
Category:Taxa named by Henri Heim de Balsac
