= Theodor Haltenorth =

German mammalogist

Dr. Theodor Haltenorth (May 18, 1910 – January 30, 1981) was a German mammalogist. He worked mainly in Munich, Bavaria, Germany, and was a key figure in the Quagga Project. He also taxonomised the Cretan wildcat in 1953.
