= Louis Lavauden =

French zoologist and forester

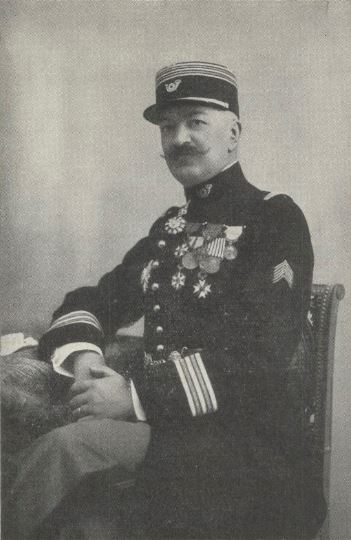
Adrien Joseph Louis Lavauden (1885–1935) in the year 1927

Louis Lavauden (19 June 1881, in Grenoble – 1 September 1935, in Anjou, Isère) was a French zoologist and forester.

He was a student at the Institut agronomique et de l'Ecole forestière in Nancy, afterwards conducting zoological studies of the province Dauphiné. In 1912–13 he performed research of the fauna in Algeria and Tunisia, and following World War I, returned to Tunisia as a forester. In 1925 he took part in one of the first motorized crossings of the Sahara (from Tunis to Cotonou via Lake Chad). From 1928 he was stationed in Madagascar, where he collected zoological specimens that included a number of lemur species.

Lavauden is credited with providing descriptions for several new mammal and avian species/subspecies. Many of his collections are housed at the natural history museum in Grenoble fr:Muséum d'histoire naturelle de Grenoble.

He was, from 1929, on the editorial committee of Alauda, Revue internationale d'Ornithologie fr:Alauda, Revue internationale d'Ornithologie with its founder Paul Paris and Noël Mayaud, Henri Heim de Balsac, Jacques de Chavigny, Henri Jouard, Jacques Delamain and Paul Poty.

== Selected publications ==
- Oiseaux, 1924.
- La Chasse et la faune cynègètique en Tunisie, 1924.
- Les vertèbrès du Sahara : èlèments de zoologie saharienne, 1926.
- Le Problème forestier colonial. Avec 7 photographies et 3 planches hors texte, 1931.
- Le problème forestier colonial, 1931.
  - Books by Lavauden that have been translated into English:
- The colonial forest problem, 1934.
- The equatorial forest of Africa : its past, present and future, 1937.

He was, in 1929, a founder of Alauda, Revue internationale d'Ornithologie with Noël Mayaud, Henri Heim de Balsac, Jacques de Chavigny, Paul Paris, Henri Jouard, Jacques Delamain and Paul Poty.
