= Salvia ekimiana =

Scientific classification
- Kingdom: Plantae
- Clade: Tracheophytes
- Clade: Angiosperms
- Clade: Eudicots
- Clade: Asterids
- Order: Lamiales
- Family: Lamiaceae
- Genus: Salvia
- Species: S. ekimiana

Binomial name
- Salvia ekimiana F. Celep & Doğan

Species of flowering plant

Salvia ekimiana is a perennial plant that is endemic to Central Anatolia in Turkey, growing in open pine forest and alpine steppe at 1,700 to 2,000 m (5,600 to 6,600 ft) elevation.

S. ekimiana grows on erect to ascending stems to 10 to 30 cm (3.9 to 11.8 in), with mostly basal leaves that are generally oblong, or ovate to oblong or oblanceolate. The leaves are 2.5 to 7 cm (0.98 to 2.76 in) long and 1 to 2.5 cm (0.39 to 0.98 in) wide. The corolla is white with a lilac hood, .7 to 1.1 cm (0.28 to 0.43 in), and with a greyish calyx with a violet stripe. The specific epithet honors professor Tuna Ekim, a Turkish botanist.
