= Steppe =

Ecoregion of plain grasslands without trees

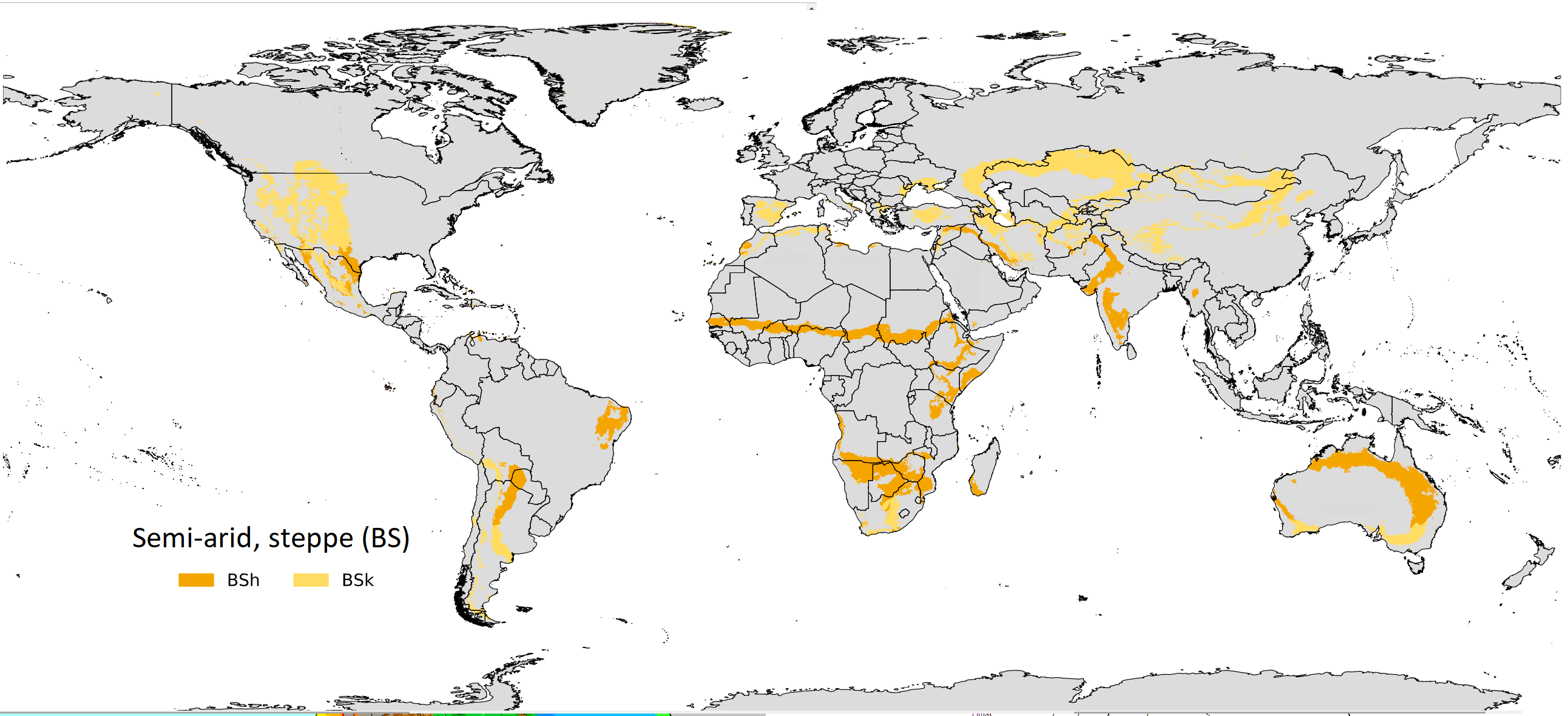
Two types of steppes, classified by climate:
Cold steppe climate
Hot steppe climate

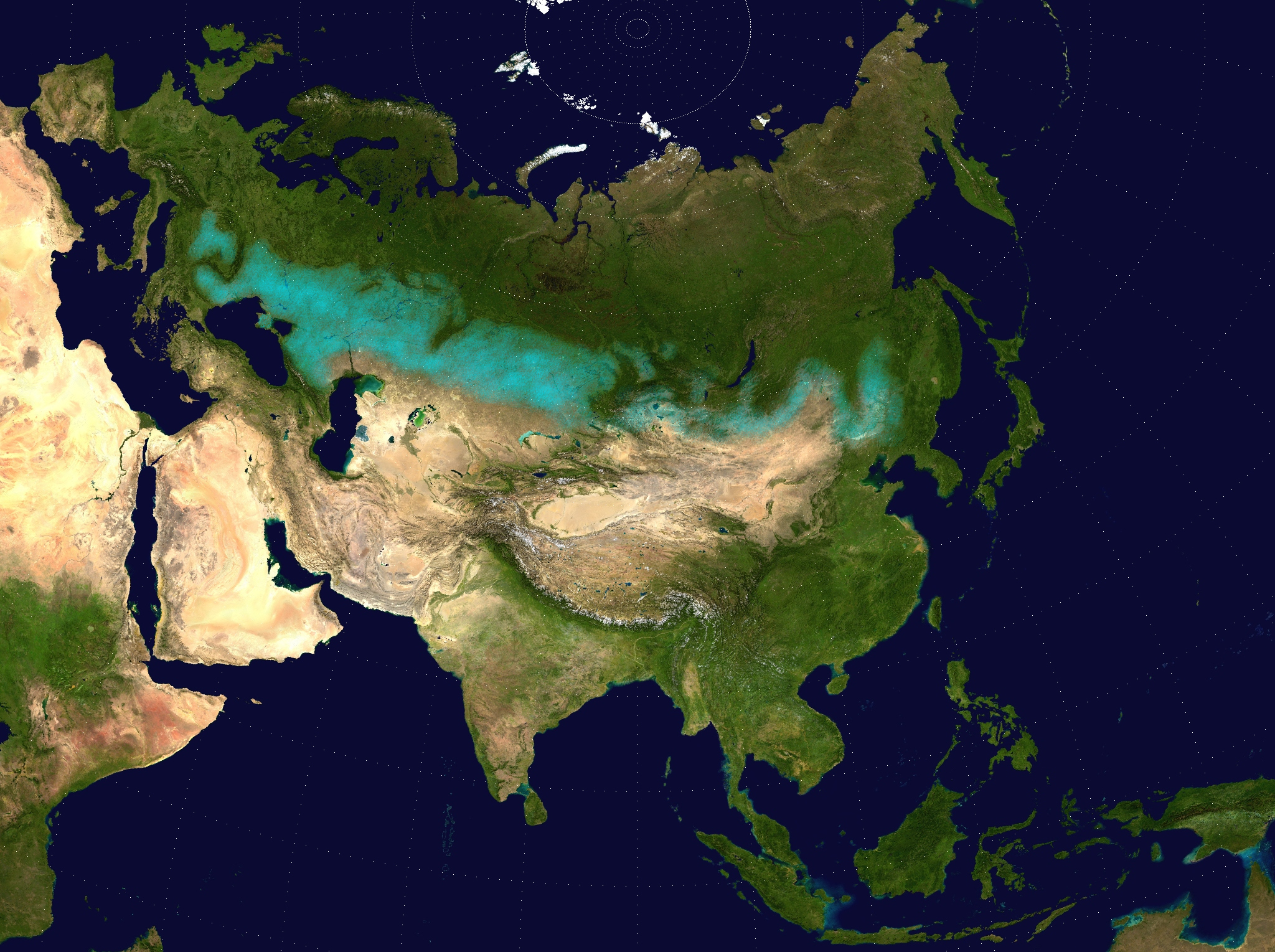
The Great Eurasian Steppe (highlighted in on the map), acted as a passageway for cultures across the vast Eurasian landmass.

In physical geography, a steppe (/stɛp/) is an ecoregion characterized by grassland plains without closed forests except near rivers and lakes.

Steppe biomes may include:

- the montane grasslands and shrublands biome
- the tropical and subtropical grasslands, savannas, and shrublands biome
- the temperate grasslands, savannas, and shrublands biome

A steppe is usually covered with grass and shrubs, depending on the season and latitude. The term steppe climate denotes a semi-arid climate, which is too dry to support a forest, but not dry enough to be a desert.

Steppes are characterized by a semi-arid or continental climate. Temperature extremes can be recorded in the summer of up to 45 °C (115 °F) and in winter of down to −55 °C (−65 °F). Besides this major seasonal difference, fluctuations between day and night are also significant: in both the highlands of Mongolia and northern Nevada, 30 °C (85 °F) can be reached during the day with sub-freezing readings at night.

Steppes average 250–500 mm (10–20 in) of annual precipitation and feature hot summers and cold winters when located in mid-latitudes. In addition to the precipitation level, its combination with potential evapotranspiration defines a steppe climate.

== Classification ==
Steppe can be classified by climate:

- Temperate steppe: the true steppe, found in continental climates can be further subdivided, as in the Rocky Mountains Steppes
- Subtropical steppe: a similar association of plants occurring in the driest areas with a Mediterranean climate; it usually has a short wet period

It can also be classified by vegetation type, e.g. shrub-steppe and alpine-steppe.

=== Cold steppe ===
The world's largest steppe region, often referred to as "the Great Steppe", is found in Eastern Europe and Central Asia, found in countries stretching from Ukraine in the west through Russia, Kazakhstan, Turkmenistan and Uzbekistan to the Altai, Koppet Dag and Tian Shan ranges in China. The Eurasian Steppe had a significant role in the spread of the horse, the wheel and Indo-European languages. In the Eurasian steppe, soils often consist of chernozem.

The inner parts of Anatolia in Turkey, Central Anatolia and East Anatolia in particular and also some parts of Southeast Anatolia, as well as much of Armenia and Iran are largely dominated by cold steppe.

The Pannonian Plain is another steppe region in Central Europe, centered in Hungary but also including portions of Slovakia, Poland, Ukraine, Romania, Serbia, Croatia, Slovenia, and Austria. Another large steppe area (prairie) is located in the Central United States, western Canada and the northern part of Mexico. The shortgrass prairie steppe is the westernmost part of the Great Plains region. The Columbia Plateau in southern British Columbia, Oregon, Idaho, and Washington state, is an example of a steppe region in North America outside of the Great Plains.

In South America, cold steppe can be found in Patagonia and much of the high elevation regions east of the southern Andes.

Relatively small steppe areas can be found in the interior of the South Island of New Zealand.

In Australia, a moderately sized temperate steppe region exists in the northern and northwest regions of Victoria, extending to the southern and mid regions of New South Wales. This area borders the semi-arid and arid Australian Outback which is found farther inland on the continent.

=== Subtropical steppe ===
In Europe, some Mediterranean areas have a steppe-like vegetation, such as central Sicily in Italy, southern Portugal, parts of Greece in the southern Athens area, and central-eastern Spain, especially the southeastern coast (around Murcia), and places cut off from adequate moisture due to rain shadow effects such as Zaragoza.

In northern Africa, the Mediterranean area also hosts the same steppe-like vegetation, such as the Algerian-Moroccan Hautes Plaines and by extension the North Saharan steppe and woodlands.

In Asia, a subtropical steppe can be found in semi-arid lands that fringe the Thar Desert of the Indian subcontinent as well as much of the Deccan Plateau in the rain shadow of the Western Ghats, and the Badia of the Levant.

In Australia, subtropical steppe can be found in a belt surrounding the most severe deserts of the continent and around the Musgrave Ranges.

In North America this environment is typical of transition areas between zones with a Mediterranean climate and true deserts, such as Reno, Nevada, the inner part of California, and much of western Texas and adjacent areas in Mexico.

== Human impact ==
Humans have severe impacts on their environments. Among many examples the following two give only an impression.

- The formation of the forest steppe of Eastern Europe in the fourth millennium BC appeared in the context of the Trypillia culture and very probably, the economy of this culture with its large settlements contributed to the process.
- The formation of the Błędów Desert in Poland in the Middle Ages was certainly man-made.
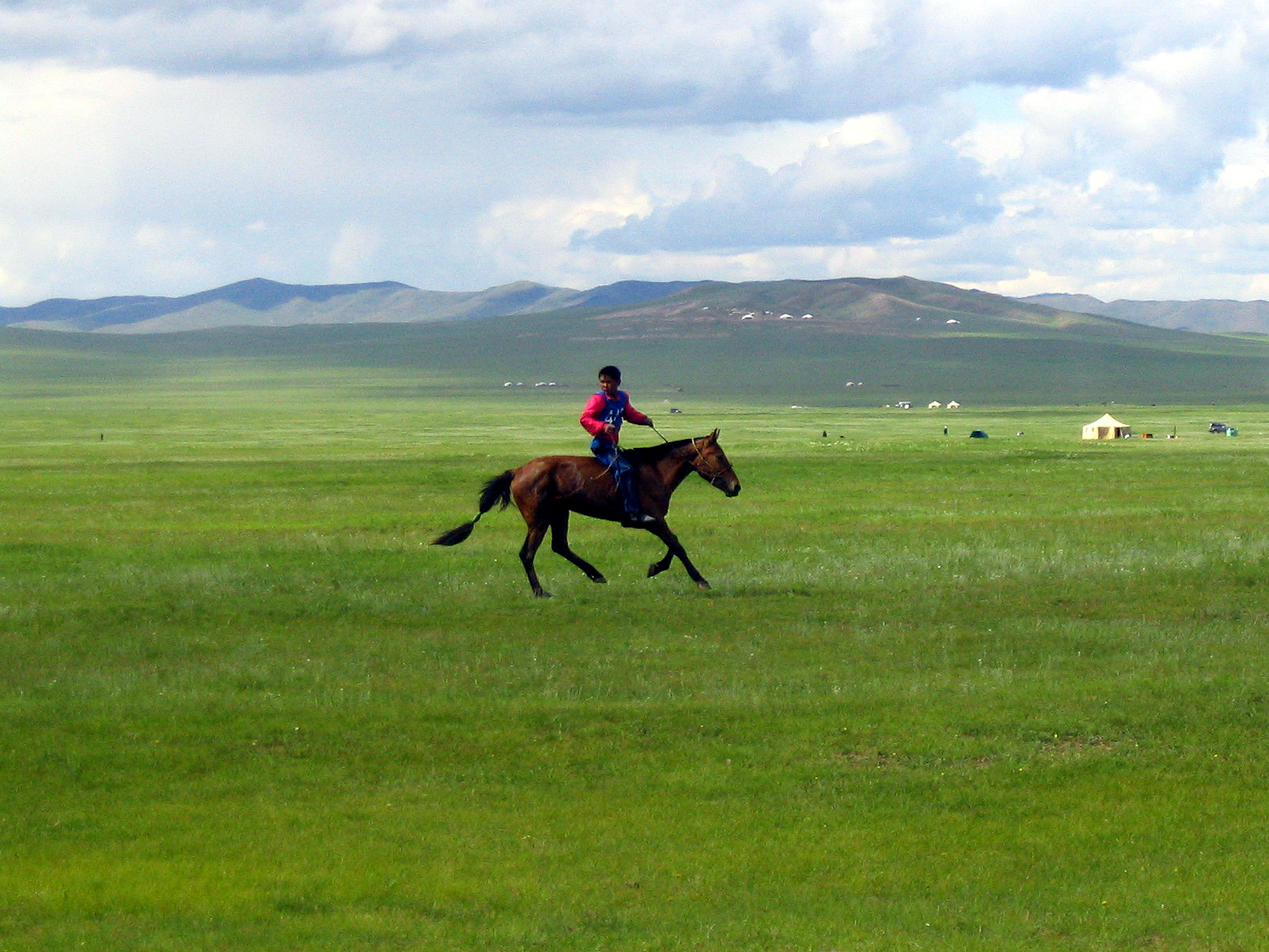
Steppe in Mongolia

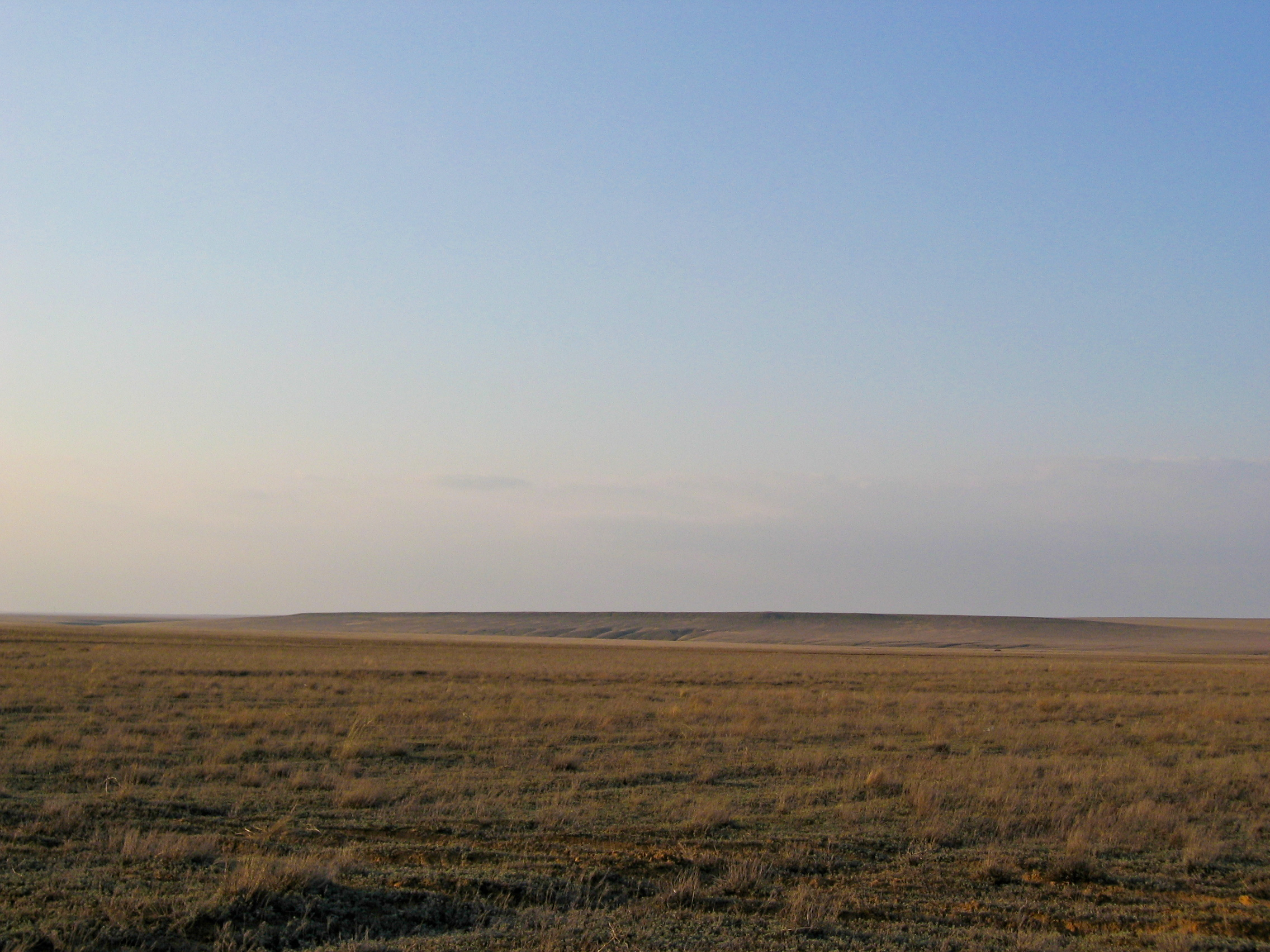
Steppe in Kazakhstan

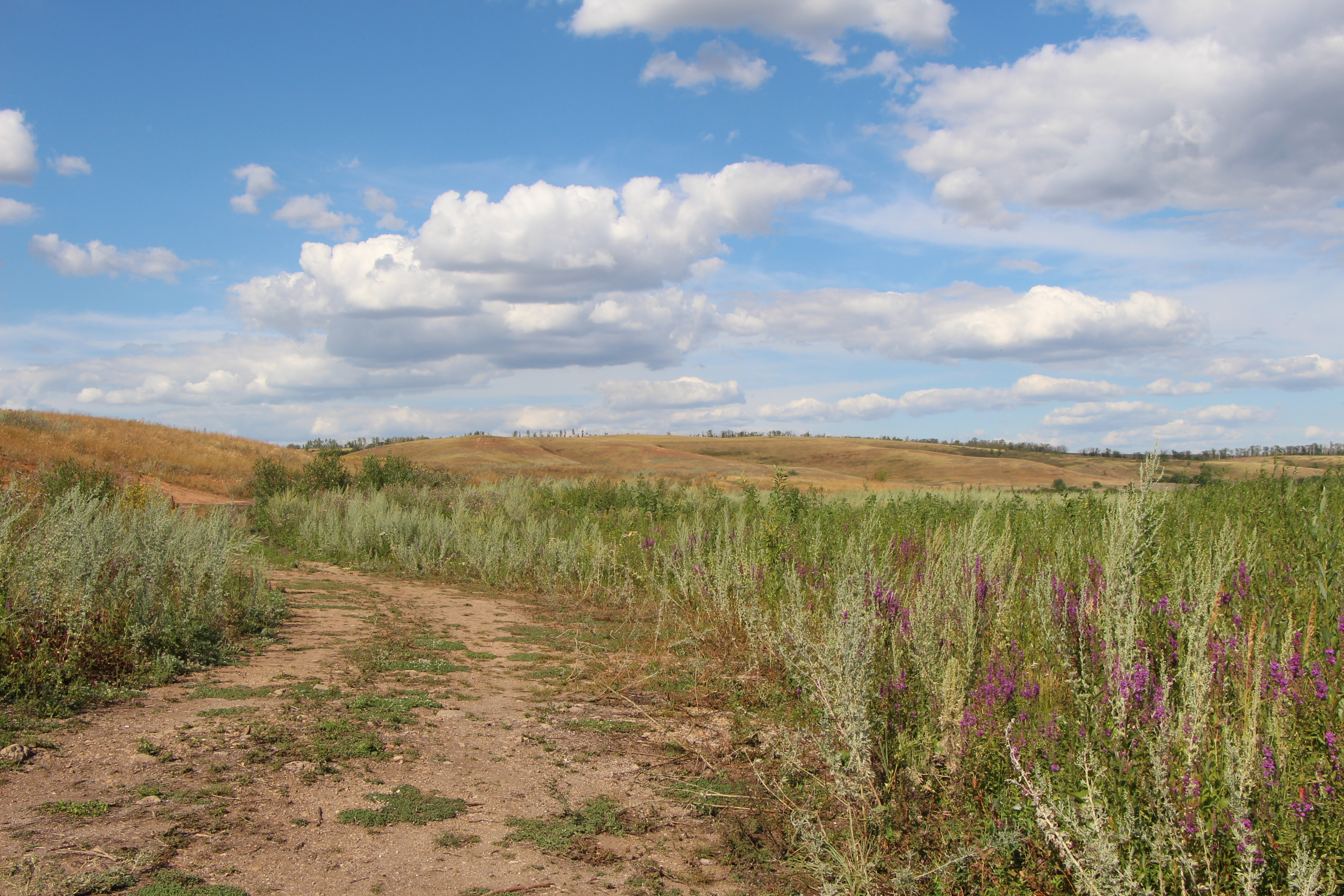
Steppe in Russia

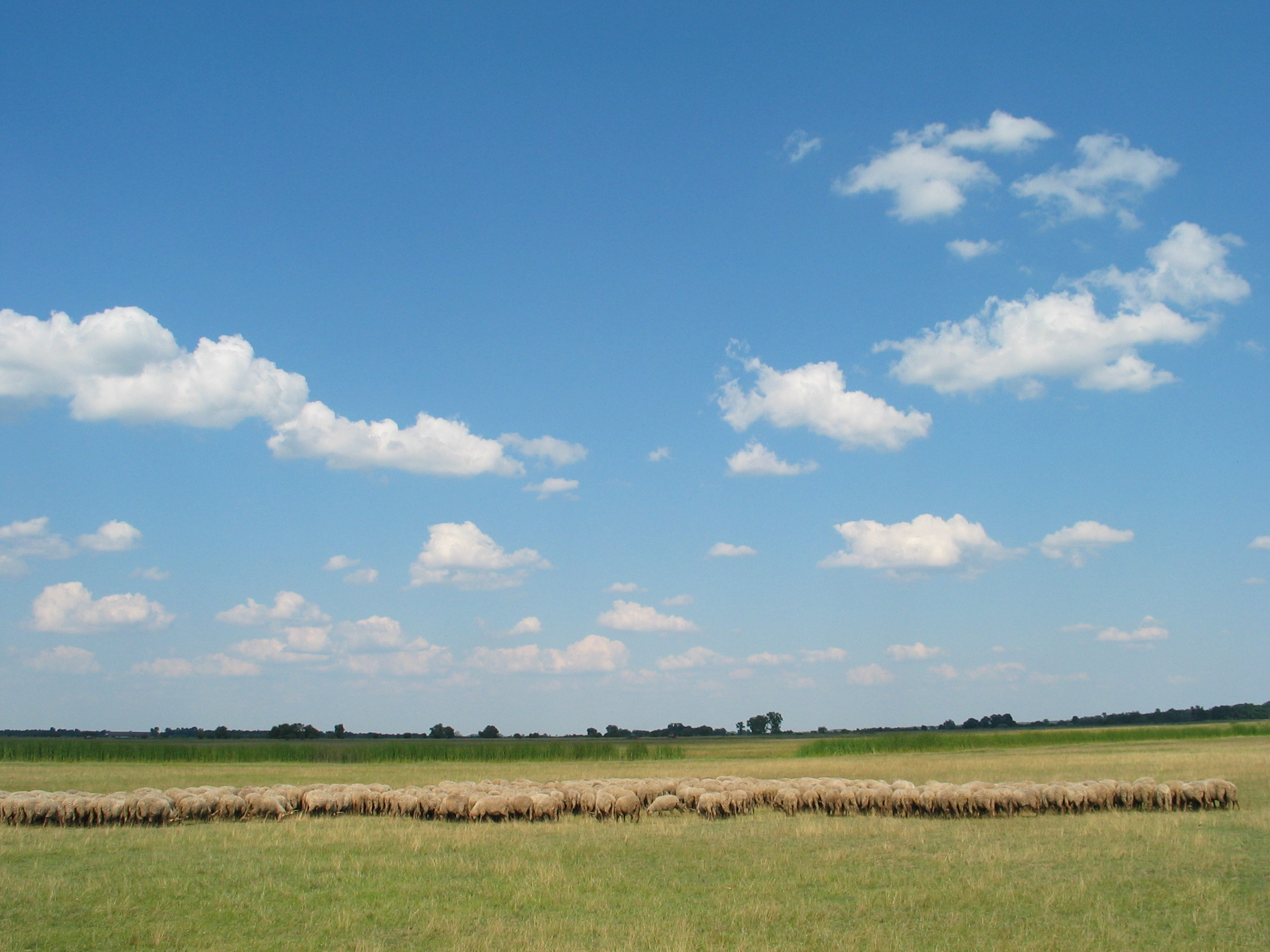
Steppe in Hungary

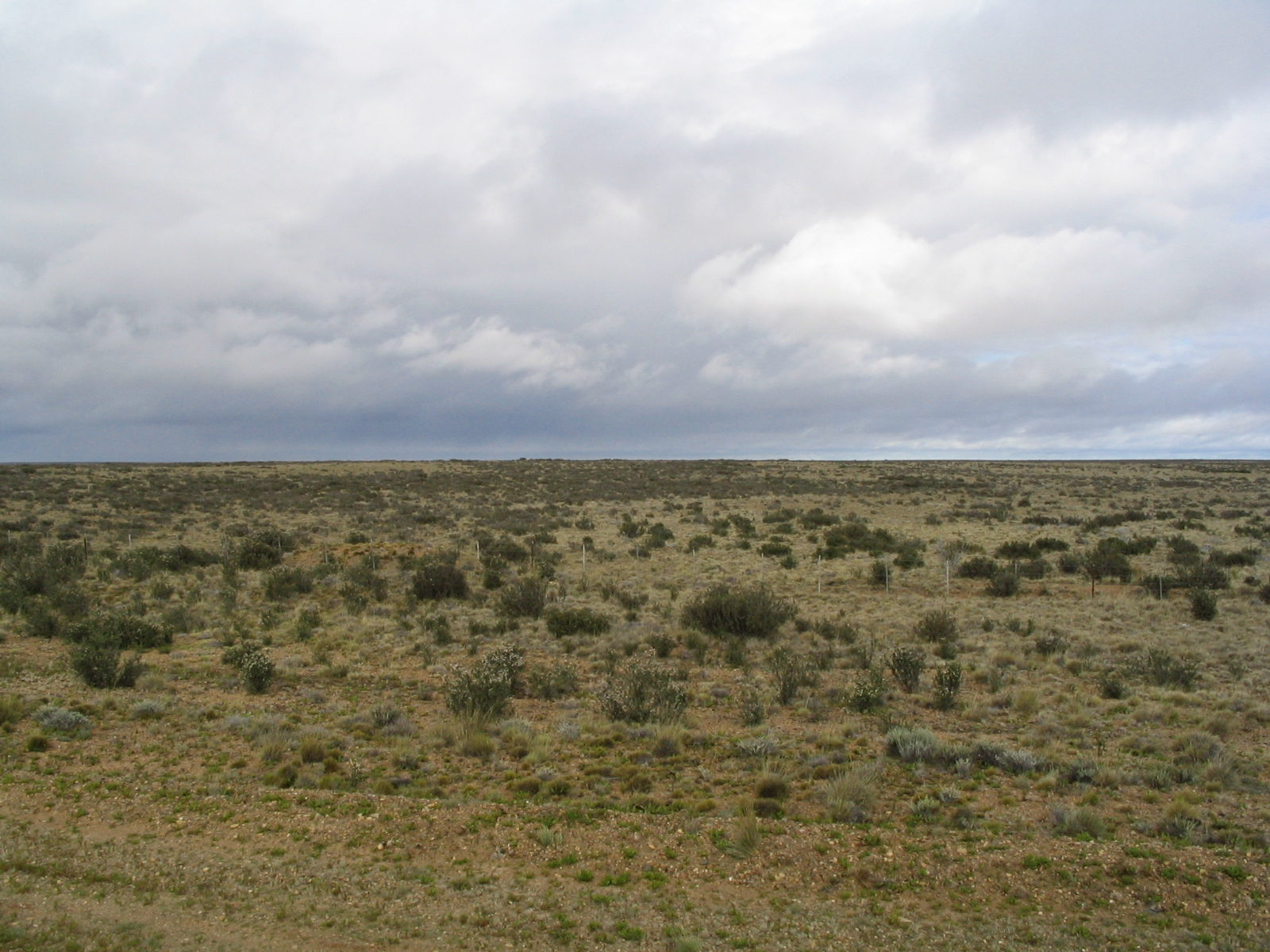
Cold Patagonian steppe near Fitz Roy, Argentina

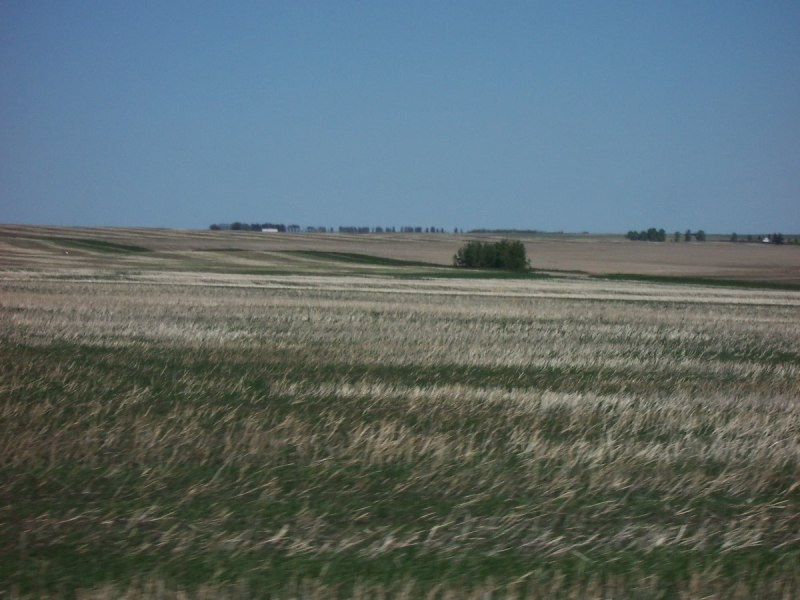
Prairie in Alberta, Canada

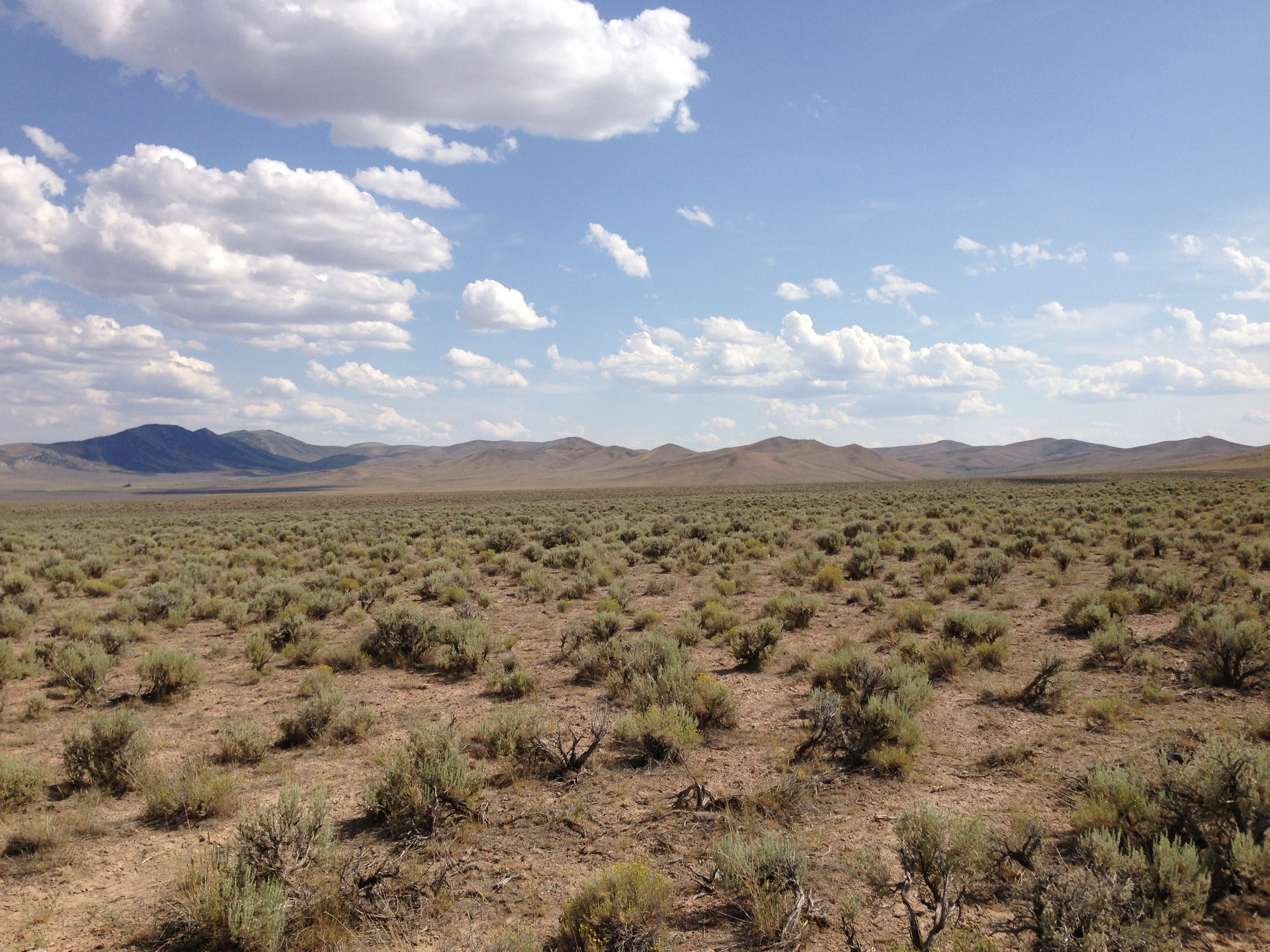
Sagebrush steppe in northeastern Nevada (U.S. Route 93)

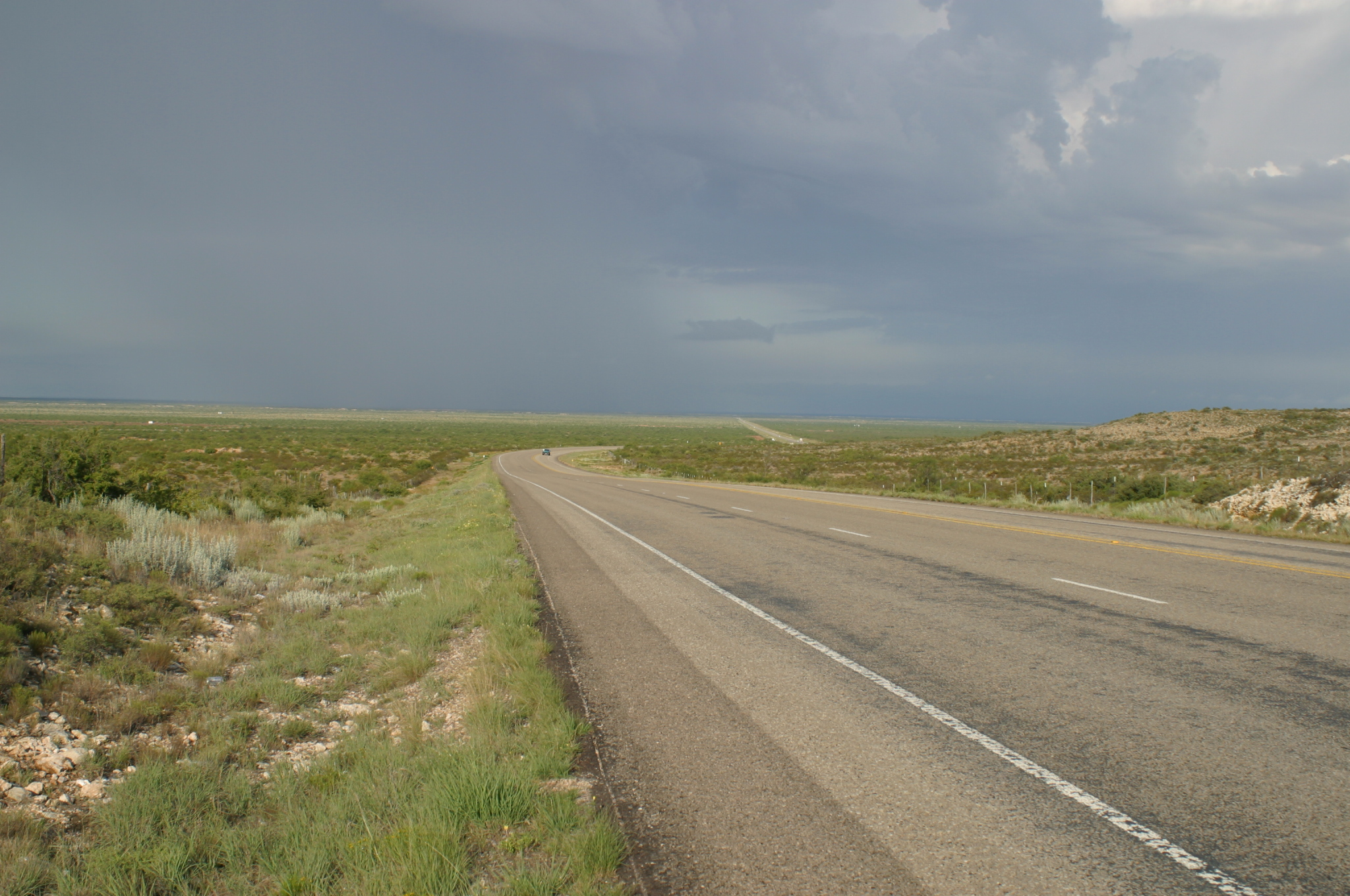
Steppe in West Texas

== Notable fauna ==
- Saiga (Saiga tatarica)

- Red deer (Cervus elaphus)

- Western roe deer (Capreolus capreolus)

- Eastern roe deer (Capreolus pygargus)

- Reindeer (Rangifer tarandus)

- Onager (Equus hemionus)

- Wild horse (Equus ferus)

- Grey wolf (Canis lupus)

- Corsac fox (Vulpes corsac)

- Red fox (Vulpes vuples)

- Pallas’s cat (Otocolobus manul)

- Brown bear (Ursus arctos)

- Common buzzard (Buteo buteo)

- Steppe polecat (Mustela eversmanii)

- Marbled polecat (Vormela peregusna)

- Ermine (Stoat) (Mustela erminea)

- Steppe eagle (Aquila nipalensis)

- Lesser kestrel (Falco naumanni)

== See also ==
- Mammoth steppe
- Grassland
- Plain
- Prairie
- Savanna
- Tugay
- Tundra
