= Zelenogorsk (Pallas's cat) =

Pallas's cat at Novosibirsk Zoo, Russia

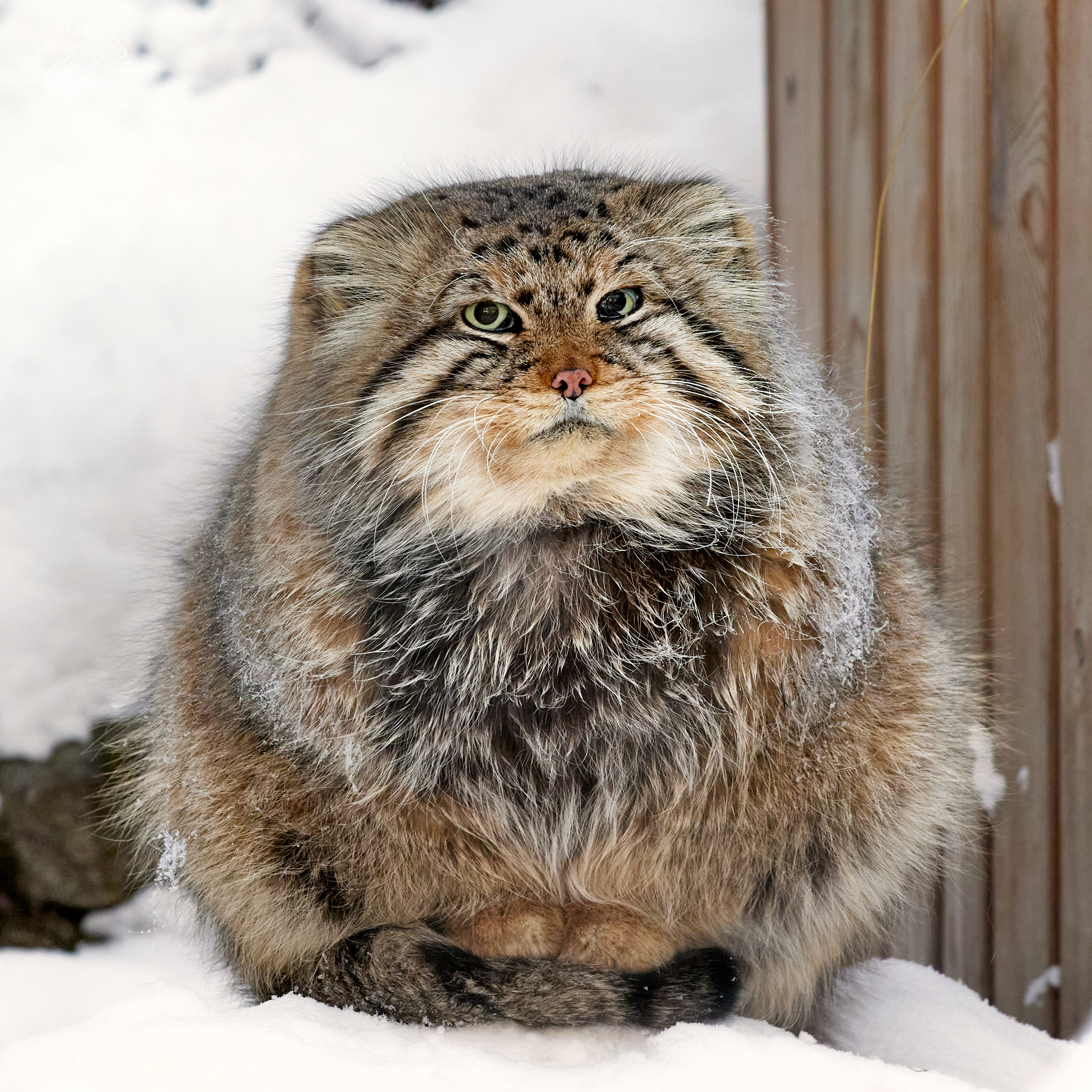
- Zelenogorsk in January 2024
- Other name: Green
- Species: Pallas's cat (Otocolobus manul)
- Sex: Male
- Born: 2012 or 2013; Tuva, Russia
- Died: 2025 or 2026; Novosibirsk, Russia
- Years active: 2014–2025
- Residence: Novosibirsk Zoo, Russia

External videos
- Zelenogorsk the Pallas's cat warms his paws on his tail

Zelenogorsk (Russian: Зеленогорск, romanized: green mountain, also officially known by the name Green) was a Pallas's cat housed at the Novosibirsk Zoo in Russia.

== Early life ==
He was born in 2012 or 2013 in the wild in Tuva. He was kept at the Zelenogorsk Zoo, Krasnoyarsk Krai, before being transferred to the Novosibirsk Zoo in 2014, where he received his name.

== Popularity ==
Although Pallas's cats are typically secretive, Zelenogorsk often allowed visitors to observe him, and he gained popularity through numerous photographs and videos. In particular, a video of him putting his paws on his tail to keep warm (a common behavior among Pallas's cats) went viral. The press office of the Novosibirsk Zoo noted his unusual behaviour.

Zelenogorsk fathered several dozen kittens, including Timofey, the living mascot of the Moscow Zoo.

In 2019 his left eye was damaged as a result of an infection, leaving a distinctive scar on his lower eyelid.

Around late-June of 2025, Zelenogorsk was moved to an off-exhibit enclosure next-door to another enclosure belonging to Karaganda, another Pallas's Cat being housed in Novosibirsk Zoo. Both Zelenogorsk and Karaganda died in late 2025, seven months after being taken off-exhibit.
