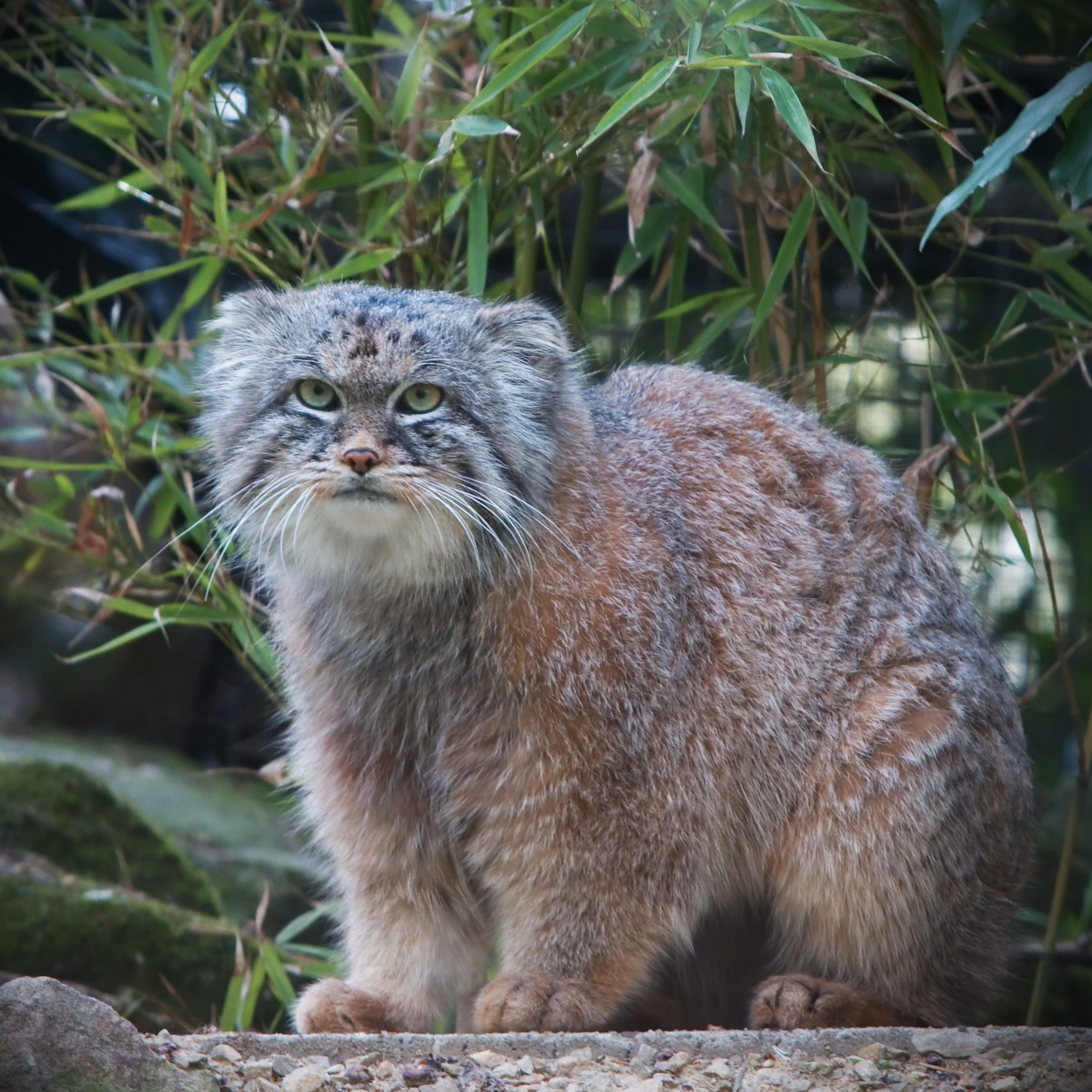
- A Pallas's cat at Rotterdam Zoo

Conservation status
- Least Concern (IUCN 3.1)
- CITES Appendix II

Scientific classification
- Kingdom: Animalia
- Phylum: Chordata
- Class: Mammalia
- Order: Carnivora
- Family: Felidae
- Subfamily: Felinae
- Genus: Otocolobus; Brandt, 1841
- Species: O. manul

Binomial name
- Otocolobus manul (Pallas, 1776)

Subspecies
- O. m. manul (Pallas, 1776); O. m. nigripectus (Hodgson, 1842)
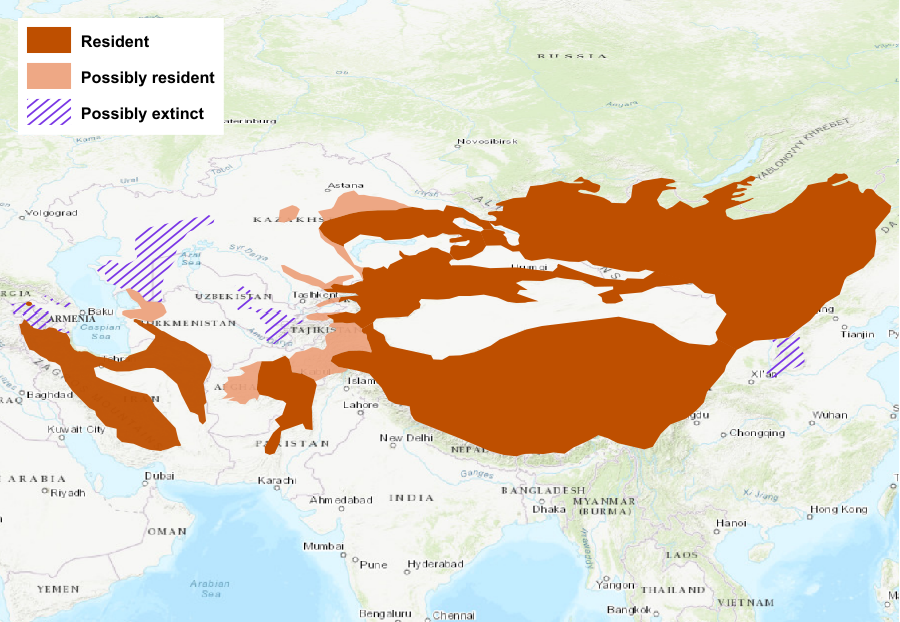
- Distribution of Pallas's cat

= Pallas's cat =

Species of small wild cat

Pallas's cat (Otocolobus manul), also called manul, is a small wild cat with long and dense light grey fur, and rounded ears set low on the sides of the head. Its head-and-body length ranges from 46 to 65 cm (18 to 26 in) with a 21–31 cm (8.3–12.2 in) long bushy tail. It is well camouflaged and adapted to the cold continental climate in its native range, which receives little rainfall and experiences a wide range of temperatures.

Pallas's cat was first described in 1776 by Peter Simon Pallas, who observed it in the vicinity of Lake Baikal. Since then, it has been recorded across a large region in Central Asia, albeit in widely spaced sites from the Caucasus, Iranian Plateau, Hindu Kush, parts of the Himalayas, Tibetan Plateau to the Altai-Sayan region and South Siberian Mountains. It inhabits rocky montane grasslands and shrublands, where the snow cover is below 15–20 cm (6–8 in). It finds shelter in rock crevices and burrows, and preys foremost on lagomorphs and rodents. The female gives birth to between two and six kittens in spring.

Due to its widespread range and assumed large population, Pallas's cat has been listed as Least Concern on the IUCN Red List since 2020. Some population units are threatened by poaching, prey base decline due to rodent control programs, and habitat fragmentation as a result of mining and infrastructure projects.

Pallas's cat has been kept in zoos since the early 1950s. As of 2018, 60 zoos in Europe, Russia, North America and Japan participate in Pallas's cat captive breeding programs.

== Etymology ==
"Manul" is Pallas's cat's name in the Mongolian language, and it is called "manol" in the Kyrgyz language. The common name 'Pallas's cat' was coined by William Thomas Blanford in honour of Peter Simon Pallas.

== Taxonomy ==
Felis manul was the scientific name used by Peter Simon Pallas in 1776, who first described a Pallas's cat that he had encountered near the Dzhida River southeast of Lake Baikal. Several Pallas's cat zoological specimens were subsequently described:

- Felis nigripectus proposed by Brian Houghton Hodgson in 1842 was based on three specimens from Tibet.
- Otocolobus manul ferrugineus proposed by Sergey Ognev in 1928 was an erythristic specimen from the Kopet Dag mountains.

Otocolobus was proposed by Johann Friedrich von Brandt in 1842 as a generic name. Reginald Innes Pocock recognized the taxonomic rank of Otocolobus in 1907, described several Pallas's cat skulls in detail and considered Pallas's cat an aberrant form of Felis.

In 1951, John Ellerman and Terence Morrison-Scott considered

- the nominate subspecies Felis manul manul to be distributed from Russian Turkestan to Transbaikalia;
- F. m. nigripecta to be distributed in Tibet and Kashmir;
- F. m. ferruginea occurring from southwestern Turkestan and the Kopet Dag mountains to Afghanistan and Balochistan.

Since 2017, the Cat Classification Task Force of the Cat Specialist Group recognises only two subspecies as valid taxa, namely:

- O. m. manul syn. O. m. ferrugineus in the western and northern part of Central Asia from Iran to Mongolia;
- O. m. nigripectus in the Himalayas from Kashmir to Bhutan.

=== Phylogeny ===
Phylogenetic analysis of the nuclear DNA in tissue samples from all Felidae species revealed that the evolutionary radiation of the Felidae began in Asia during the late Miocene around 14.45 to 8.38 million years ago. Analysis of mitochondrial DNA of all Felidae species indicates a radiation at around 16.76 to 6.46 million years ago. Pallas's cat is estimated to have genetically diverged from a common ancestor with the genus Prionailurus between 8.55 to 4.8 million years ago based on analysis of nuclear DNA. Based on analysis of mitochondrial DNA, it diverged 9.4 to 1.46 million years ago from a common ancestor with Felis.

Phylogenetic relationships of Pallas's cat as derived through analysis of

nuclear DNA:

- Felidae
  - Felinae
    - 8.55–4.8 mya
      - Prionailurus 6.54–3.42 mya
        - - - Leopard cat (P. bengalensis)
            - Fishing cat (P. viverrinus)
          - Flat-headed cat (P. planiceps)
        - Rusty-spotted cat (P. rubiginosus)
      - Otocolobus
        Pallas's cat
    - other Felinae lineages
  - Pantherinae

mitochondrial DNA:

- Felidae
  - Felinae
    - 13.10–4.21 mya
      - 9.40–1.46 mya
        - Felis 6.52–1.03 mya
          - other Felis species
          - Jungle cat (F. chaus)
        - Pallas's cat
      - - Prionailurus 8.76–0.73 mya
          - - - Leopard cat
              - Fishing cat
            - Flat-headed cat
          - Rusty-spotted cat
    - other Felinae lineages
  - Pantherinae

== Characteristics ==
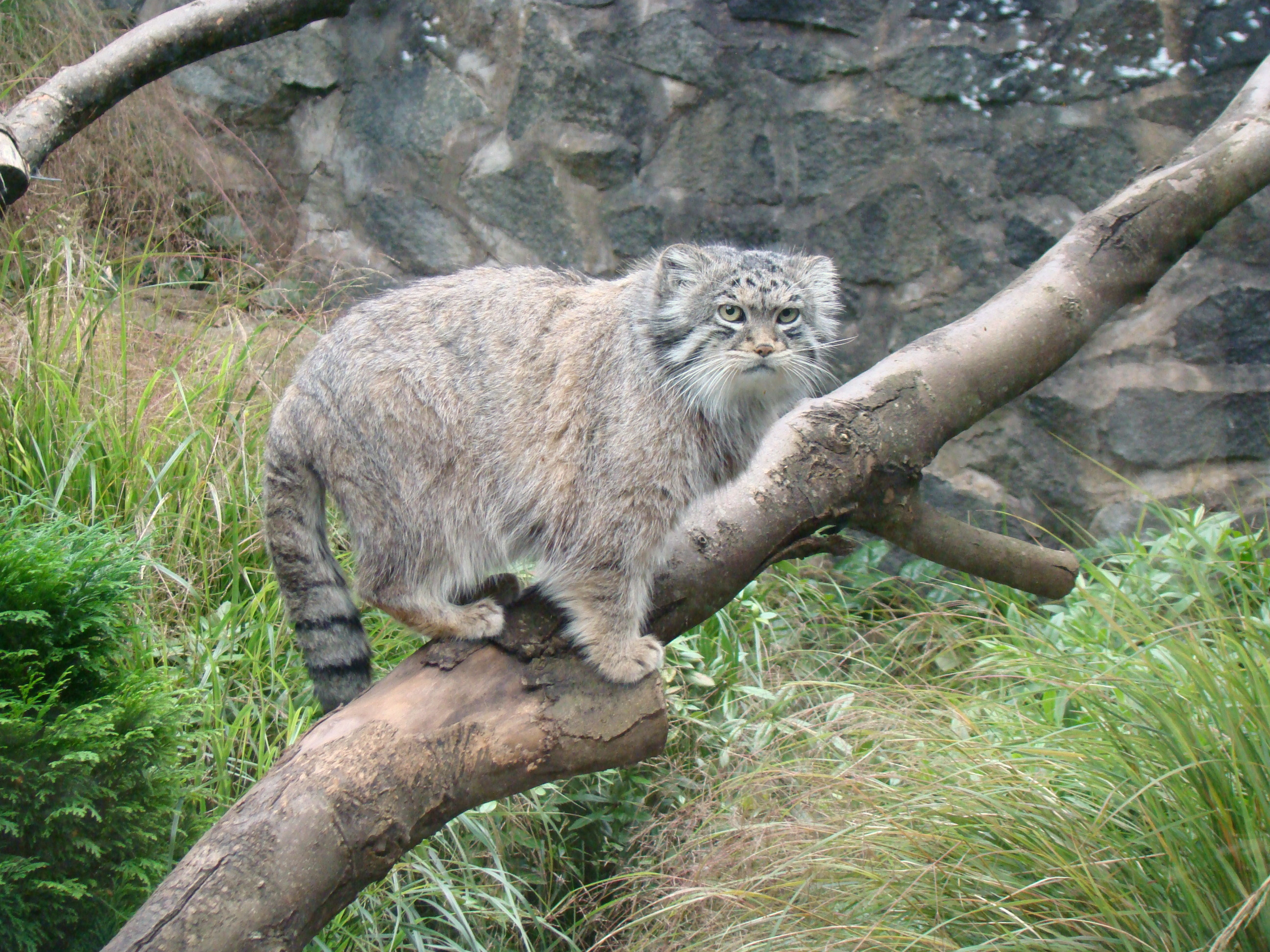
Pallas's cat in Edinburgh Zoo

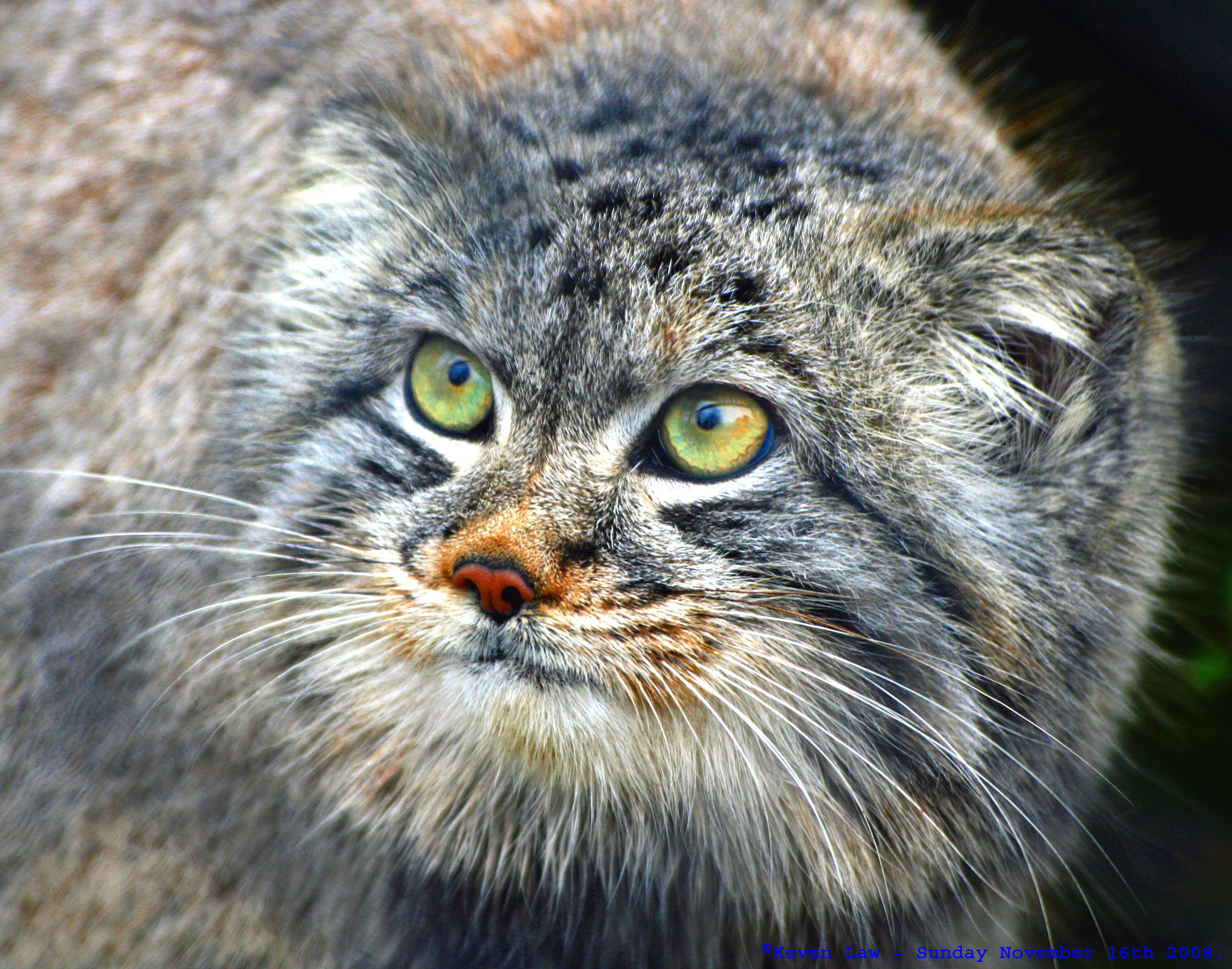
Pallas's cat in Howletts Wild Animal Park in Kent, UK

Pallas's cat's fur is light grey with pale yellowish-ochre or pale yellowish-reddish hues. Some hair tips are white and some blackish. Its fur is greyer and denser with fewer markings visible in winter than in the summer. The forehead and top of the head are light grey with small black spots. It has two black zigzag lines on the cheeks running from the corner of the eyes to the jaw joints. Its chin, whiskers, lower and upper lips are white. It has narrow black stripes on the back, consisting of five to seven dark transversal lines across the lower back. Its grey tail has seven narrow black rings and a black tip. The underfur is 40 mm (1.6 in) long and 19 μm thick, and the guard hairs up to 69 mm (2.7 in) long and 93 μm (0.0037 in) thick on the back. Its fur is soft and dense with up to 9,000 hairs/cm^{2} (58,000 hairs/in^{2}).

Pallas's cat's ears are grey with a yellowish tinge on the back and a darker rim, but with whitish hair in front and in the ear pinnae. Its rounded ears are set low on the side, such that it can peer over an object and show only a relatively small part of the head above the eyes without depressing the ears. This can give its face a look of ferocity and unrest. Its eyes are encircled by white. The iris is yellowish, and its pupils contract to small circular disks in sunlight. Among the Felinae, it shares this trait of round pupils with Puma, Herpailurus and Acinonyx species.

Pallas's cat is about the size of a domestic cat (Felis catus). Its stocky posture with the long and dense fur make it appear stout and plush. Its head-to-body is 46–65 cm (18–26 in) long with a 21–31 cm (8.3–12.2 in) long tail. It weighs 2.5–4.5 kg (5 lb 8 oz – 9 lb 15 oz). Its body is stout, and its skull is rounded with a short nasal bone, an enlarged cranial part and rounded zygomatic arches. Its orbits are large and directed forward. Its legs are short with short and sharp retractile claws.

The skull of males is 87–95 mm (3.4–3.7 in) long and 66–74 mm (2.6–2.9 in) wide at the base, and that of females is 84–96 mm (3.3–3.8 in) long and 65–68 mm (2.6–2.7 in) wide. The lower carnassial teeth are powerful, and the upper carnassials are short and massive. The first pair of upper premolars is absent. The dental formula is 3.1.2.13.1.2.1 × 2 = 28. It has a bite force at the canine tip of 155.4 newtons and a bite force quotient at the canine tip of 113.8.

The mitochondrial genome of Pallas's cat consists of 16,672 base pairs containing 13 protein-coding, 22 transfer RNA and two ribosomal RNA genes and one non-coding RNA control region.

== Distribution and habitat ==
Pallas's cat's range extends from the Caucasus eastward to Central Asia, Mongolia and adjacent parts of Dzungaria and the Tibetan Plateau. It inhabits montane shrublands and grasslands, rocky outcrops, scree slopes and ravines in areas, where the continuous snow cover is below 15–20 cm (6–8 in). In the southwestern part of its range, its habitat is affected by cold and dry winters, and moderate to low rainfall in warm summers. The typical vegetation in this part consists of small shrubs, sagebrush (Artemisia), Festuca and Stipa grasses. In the central part of its range, it inhabits hilly landscapes, high plateaus and intermontane valleys that are covered by dry steppe or semi-desert vegetation, such as low shrubs and xerophytic grasses. The continental climate in this region exhibits a range of 80 °C (140 °F) between the highest and lowest air temperatures, dropping to −50 °C (−58 °F) in winter.

The Greater Caucasus region is considered climatically suitable for Pallas's cat. In Armenia, an individual was killed near Vedi in the mountains of Ararat Province in the late 1920s. In January 2020, an individual was sighted about 140 km (90 mi) farther north in Tavush Province; the habitat at this location transitions from semi-desert to montane steppe at an elevation of about 570 m (1,900 ft). Records in Azerbaijan are limited to one Pallas's cat skin found in Karabakh and a sighting of an individual in Julfa District, both in the late 20th century.

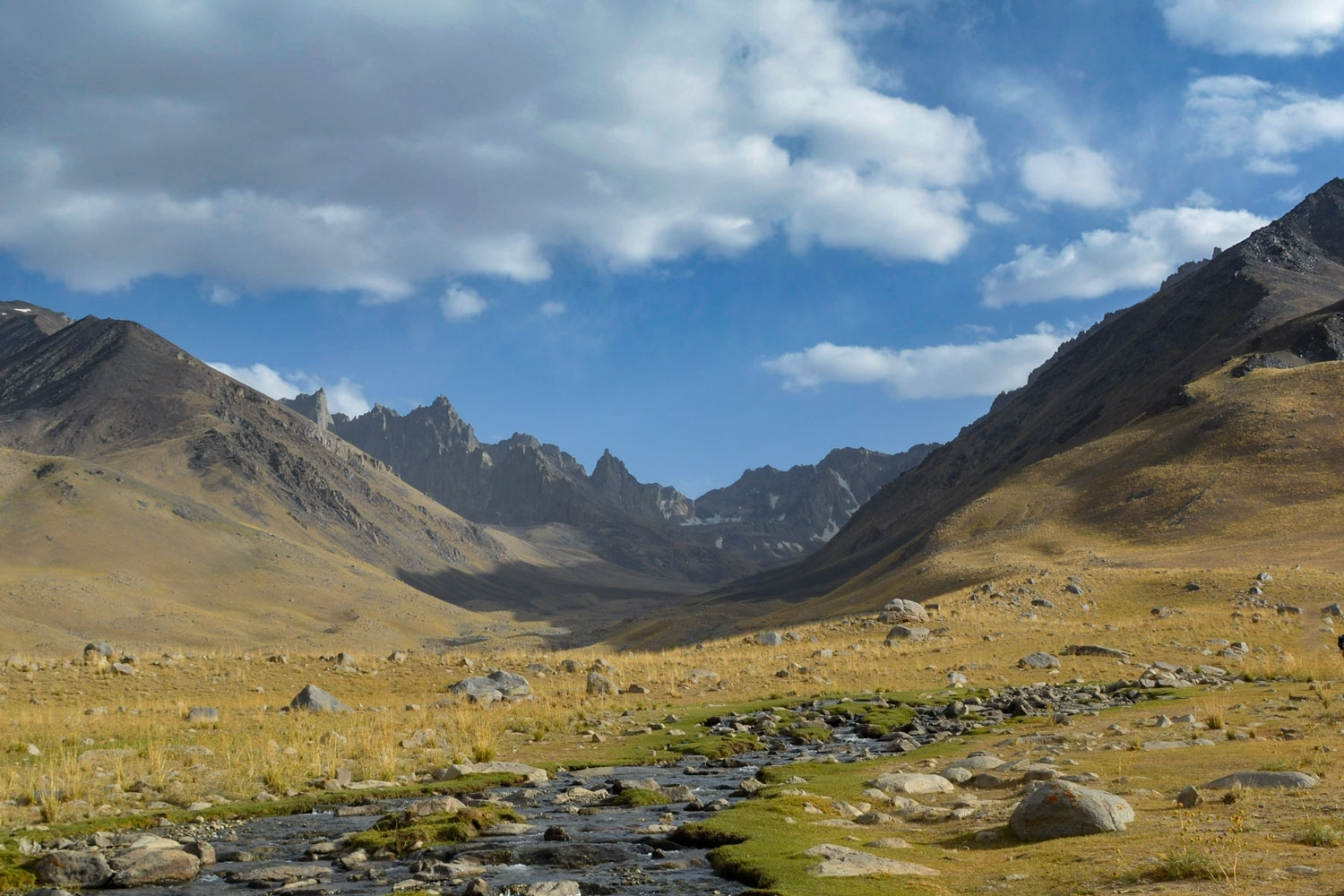
Pallas's cat inhabits rocky slopes in the Koh-i-Baba Range of the Hindu Kush.

On the Iranian Plateau, two Pallas's cats were encountered near the Aras River in northwestern Iran before the 1970s. In the area, an individual was captured at an elevation of about 1,500 m (5,000 ft) near Azarshahr in East Azerbaijan Province in 2008. In the same year, a camera trap recorded a Pallas's cat on the southern slopes of the central Alborz Mountains in Khojir National Park shortly after heavy snowfall. Farther east in the Alborz Mountains, an individual was recorded among rocks at an elevation of 2,441 m (8,009 ft) in 2016. In the Aladagh and Kopet Dag Mountains, Pallas's cat was recorded inside and in the vicinity of protected areas. In the south of the Zagros Mountains, an individual was caught in a corral used by transhumant pastoralists in Abadeh County in 2012. The surrounding area consists of rocky steppe habitat dominated by mountain almond (Prunus scoparia), Astragalus and Artemisia. In the Hindu Kush, a Pallas's cat was observed sunbathing at the fringe of a rocky high-elevation plain near Dasht-e Nawar in Afghanistan's Koh-i-Baba range in April 2007. Pallas's cat was also photographed multiple times in Bamyan Province between 2015 and 2017. In Qurumbar National Park, an individual was recorded on a ridge in a juniper dominated forest at 3,445 m (11,302 ft) in July 2012.

In the Transcaspian Region, its presence was first reported in the Kopet Dag mountains and in the vicinity of the Tedzhen and Murghab Rivers in the late 19th century. In Turkmenistan's Sünt-Hasardag Nature Reserve, a camera trap recorded an individual in 2019. Pallas's cat is allegedly also present in Köpetdag Nature Reserve.

Historical records of Pallas's cat are known in the Surxondaryo Region and Hisar Range along the border of Tajikistan and Uzbekistan. In Kyrgyzstan, it is present at high elevations of Sarychat-Eertash Nature Reserve and in the foothills of the Alay Range. In 2013, a dead female was found in a valley near Engilchek, Kyrgyzstan. In Kazakhstan, it inhabits the highlands and steppes of central and east Kazakhstan Region, the periphery of the Betpak-Dala Desert, the northern Balkhash District and the Tarbagatai Mountains.

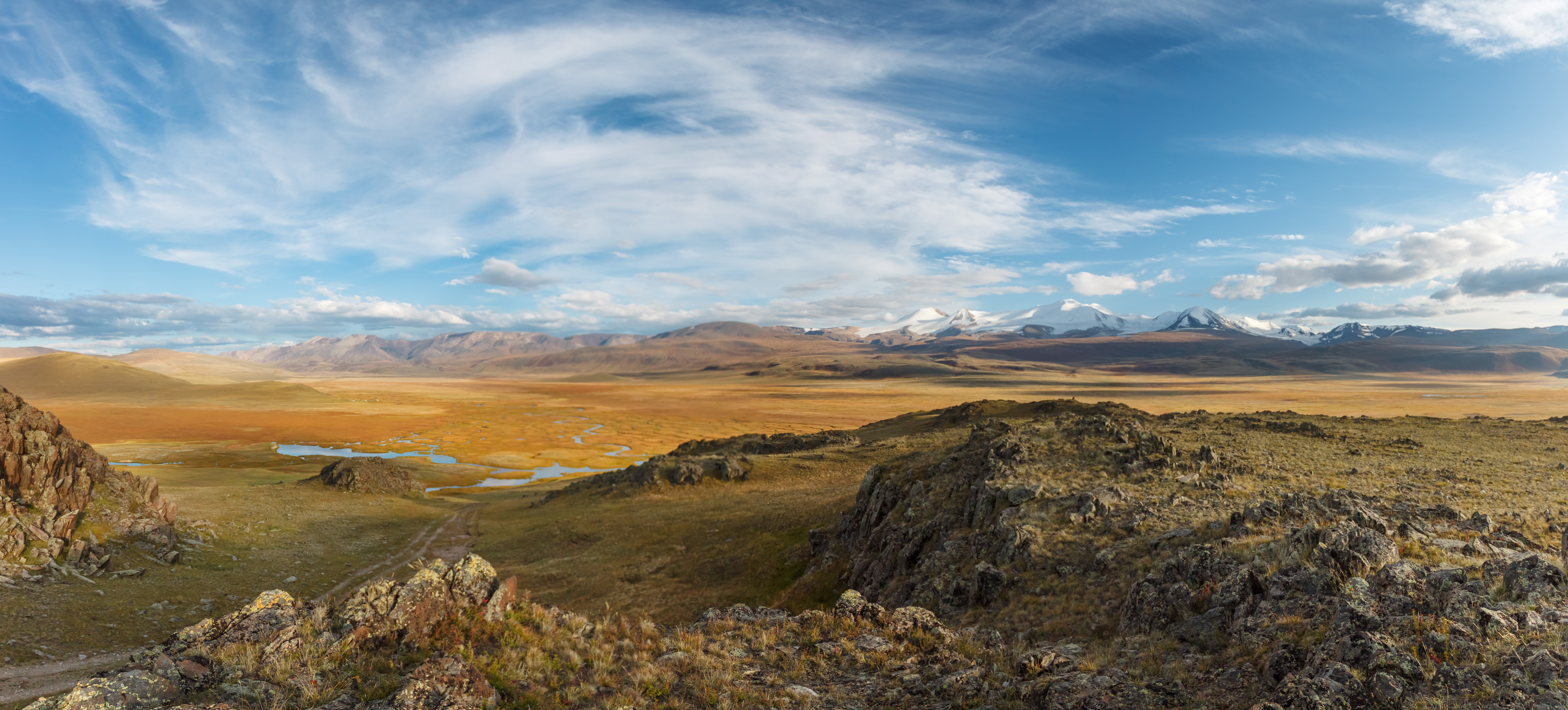
The species inhabits grassland on the Ukok Plateau.

In the South Siberian Mountains, it inhabits grasslands on the Ukok Plateau and in the Altai, Kuray and Saylyugem Mountains. It is also present in Chagan-Uzun and Argut river basins, Mongun-Taiga, Uvs Lake Basin, Sayano-Shushenski Nature Reserve, Tunkinsky National Park, Lake Gusinoye basin and in the interfluves of the Selenga, Chikoy and Khilok rivers. In the eastern Sayan Mountains, its presence was documented for the first time in 1997. In Transbaikal, it inhabits montane steppes at elevations of 600–800 m (2,000–2,600 ft), where annual rainfall ranges from 150 to 400 mm (5.9 to 15.7 in). In 2013, an individual was observed on the Vitim Plateau.

Pallas's cat inhabits the semi-desert steppe of Ikh Nartiin Chuluu Nature Reserve in Mongolia. In Gobi Gurvansaikhan National Park and Hustai National Park, it prefers rocky and rugged steppe habitats that provide cover and camouflage. On the Tibetan plateau, two Pallas's cats were observed in undulating alpine meadow amidst plateau pika (Ochotona curzoniae) colonies at 4,087 m (13,409 ft) in western China's Qumarlêb County in 2001. One of them swam across an irrigation channel. In Gêrzê County, an individual was sighted in desert steppe habitat at an elevation of 5,050 m (16,570 ft) in 2005. In 2011, Pallas's cat was photographed in an alpine meadow in the core area of Sanjiangyuan National Nature Reserve. In Ruoergai, it was observed at several places in habitat that was frequented by pastoralists and their livestock herds.

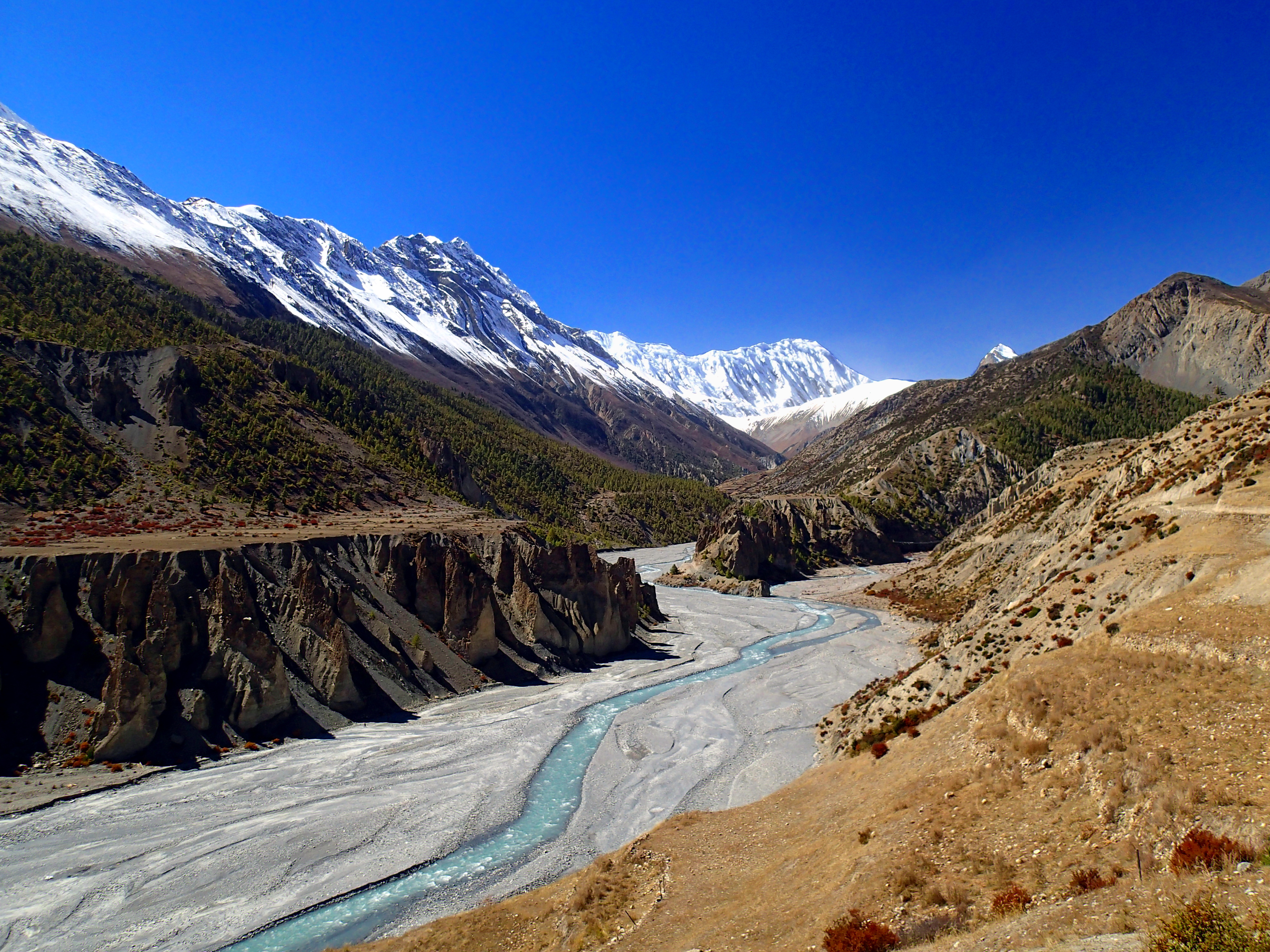
Pallas's cat occurs in alpine pastures of the upper Marshyangdi river valley in the central Himalayas.

The presence of Pallas's cat in the Indian Himalayan Region was first reported in Ladakh's upper Indus Basin in 1991. In 2007, an individual was observed on a rocky slope at an elevation of 5,073 m (16,644 ft) in the vicinity of Tso Lhamo Lake. In Changthang Wildlife Sanctuary, Pallas's cats were sighted close by riverbanks at elevations of 4,202 and 4,160 m (13,786 and 13,648 ft) in 2013 and 2015. It is also present in Karakoram Wildlife Sanctuary as indicated by genetic analysis of a scat sample found at 4,424 m (14,514 ft). In Uttarakhand's Gangotri National Park, a Pallas's cat was photographed in rocky alpine scrub at 4,800 m (15,700 ft) in the Nelang valley in 2019. In the upper Kinnaur district of Himachal Pradesh, it was recorded amongst boulders at 3,900–4,100 m (12,800–13,500 ft) in 2024. In Arunachal Pradesh, a Pallas's cat was recorded in September 2024 in the rugged high-elevation rangelands of Tawang and West Kameng districts.

In December 2012, Pallas's cat was photographed for the first time in the Nepal Himalayas, namely in the upper Marshyangdi river valley in alpine pastures at elevations of 4,200 m (13,800 ft) and 4,650 m (15,260 ft) in Annapurna Conservation Area. In Shey Phoksundo National Park, Pallas's cat scat was detected at 5,593 m (18,350 ft) in 2016, the globally highest record to date. In 2019, scat samples of two individuals were found in Sagarmatha National Park, providing the first genetic evidence of the cat's presence in the eastern Himalayas. In 2021, it was photographed at 4,771 and 5,127 m (15,653 and 16,821 ft) in upper Humla.

In Bhutan, Pallas's cat was recorded for the first time in January 2012, namely in rolling hills dominated by glacial outwash and alpine steppe vegetation in Wangchuck Centennial National Park. In autumn 2012, it was also photographed at an elevation of 4,122 m (13,524 ft) in Jigme Dorji National Park.

== Behaviour and ecology ==
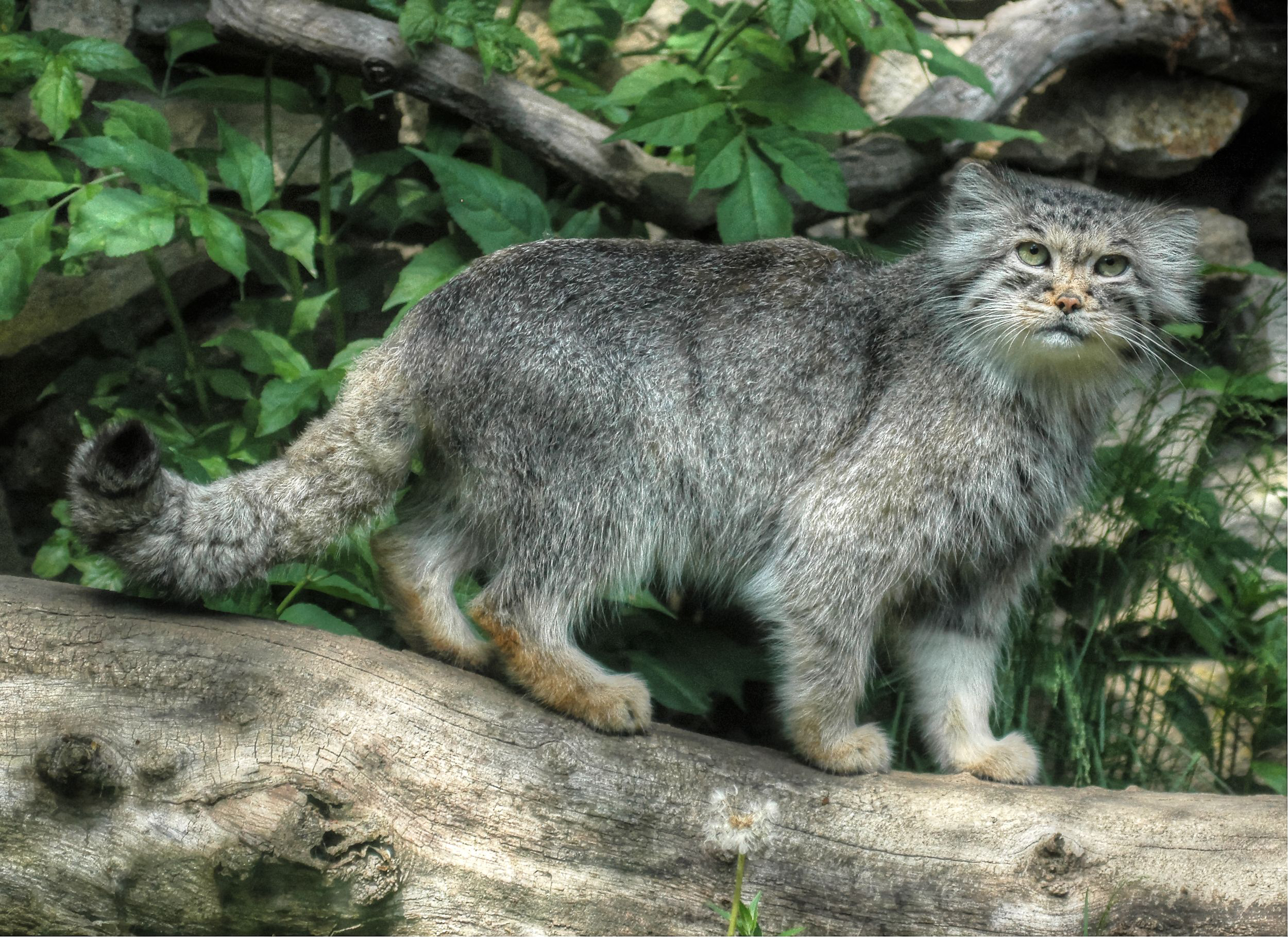
Pallas's cat

Pallas's cat is solitary. Of nine Pallas's cat kittens observed in captivity, only the two males scent marked by spraying urine. Captive Pallas's cats have been observed hissing and displaying a flehmen response; males scrape with their hind feet. Camera trap photographs taken in the Altai Mountains also show Pallas's cats scraping, spraying urine, scent marking with scat, sniffing and flehmening at scent marked places.

In the wild, Pallas's cat uses caves, rock crevices and marmot burrows as shelter. In central Mongolia, 29 Pallas's cats were fitted with radio collars between June 2005 and October 2007. They used 101 dens during this time, including 39 winter dens, 42 summer dens and 20 dens for raising kittens. The summer and winter dens usually had one entrance with a diameter of 15.6–23.4 cm (6.1–9.2 in). They resided in the summer dens for 2–21 days, and in the winter dens for 2–28 days. Summer and maternal dens were close to rocky habitats with little direct sunlight, whereas winter dens were closer to ravines. The home ranges of 16 females varied from 7.4 to 125.2 km^{2} (2.9 to 48.3 sq mi). The home ranges of nine males varied from 20.9 to 207.0 km^{2} (8.1 to 79.9 sq mi) and overlapped those of one to four females and partly also those of other males. The sizes of their home ranges decreased in winter.

In an unprotected area in central Mongolia, Pallas's cats were mainly crepuscular between May and August, but active by day from September to November. Pallas's cats recorded in four study areas in the western Mongolian Altai mountains were also active during the day, but with a lower frequency at sites where livestock was present.

=== Hunting and diet ===
Pallas's cat is a highly specialised predator of small mammals, which it catches by stalking or ambushing near exits of burrows. It also pulls out rodents with its paws from shallow burrows. In the Altai Mountains, remains of long-tailed ground squirrel (Urocitellus undulatus), flat-skulled shrew (Sorex roboratus), Pallas's pika (Ochotona pallasi), and bird feathers were found near breeding burrows of Pallas's cats. In Transbaikal, it preys on Daurian pika (Ochotona dauurica), steppe pika (O. pusilla), Daurian ground squirrel (Spermophilus dauricus), and young of red-billed chough (Pyrrhocorax pyrrhocorax).

Scat samples of Pallas's cat collected in the bufferzone of Khustain Nuruu National Park in central Mongolia contained foremost remains of Daurian pika, Mongolian gerbil (Meriones unguiculatus), Mongolian silver vole (Alticola semicanus), and remains of passerine birds, beetles, and grasshoppers. Brandt's vole (Lasiopodomys brandtii) dominated in the diet of Pallas's cats in Mongolia's Sükhbaatar Province after the irruptive growth of this vole population during 2017–2020. Scat found in Shey-Phoksundo National Park contained remains of pika species and of woolly hares (Lepus oiostolus). Remains of a cypriniform fish were found in Pallas's cat scat in Gongga Mountain Nature Reserve. Its diet in Sanjiangyuan National Nature Reserve consists foremost of plateau pika (Ochotona curzoniae), with Himalayan marmot (Marmota himalayana) and Blyth's vole (Neodon leucurus) representing less than 14%.

=== Reproduction and life cycle ===
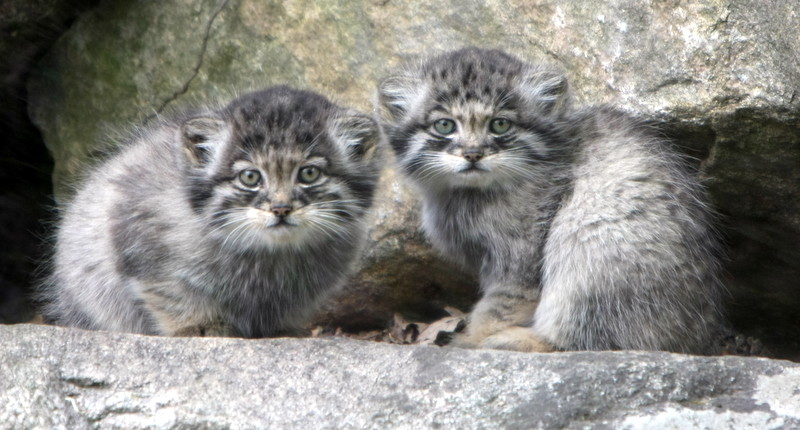
Pallas's cat kittens in Parken Zoo

The female is sexually mature at the age of about one year. She is in estrus for 26 to 42 hours. Gestation lasts 66 to 75 days.

A captive male Pallas's cat housed under natural lighting conditions showed increased aggressive and territorial behaviour at the onset of the breeding season, lasting from September to December. Its blood contained three times more testosterone than in the non-breeding season, and its ejaculate was more concentrated with more normal sperm forms and a higher motility of sperm.

In the wild, the female gives birth to a litter of two to six kittens between the end of April and late May. The newborn kittens' fur is fuzzy, and their eyes are closed until the age of about two weeks. A newborn male kitten born in a zoo weighed 89 g (3.1 oz), measured 12.3 cm (4.8 in) and had a 5.5 cm (2.2 in) long tail.

In central Mongolia, seven females with kittens were observed using 20 dens for 4–60 days. Their maternal dens were either among rocks, or in former burrows of the Tarbagan marmot (Marmota sibirica), and had at least two entrances. In Iran, a Pallas's cat was observed using cavities of aged Greek juniper (Juniperus excelsa) as breeding dens for a litter of four kittens.

Two-month-old kittens weigh 500–600 g (17.6–21.2 oz), and their fur gradually grows longer; they start hunting at the age of about five months and reach adult size by the age of six to seven months.

== Threats ==
In China, Mongolia and Russia, Pallas's cat was once hunted for its fur in large numbers of more than 10,000 skins annually. In China and the former Soviet Union, hunting of Pallas's cat decreased in the 1970s when it became legally protected. Mongolia exported 9,185 skins in 1987, but international trade has ceased since 1988. However, domestic trade of its skins and body parts for medicinal purposes continues in the country, and it may be hunted throughout the year.

Cases of herding dogs killing Pallas's cats were reported in Iran, Kazakhstan and the Altai Republic. Pallas's cats have also fallen victim in traps set for small mammals in Kazakhstan and in the Altai Republic. In Transbaikal, Pallas's cat is threatened by poaching. In Mongolia, the use of the rodenticide bromadiolone in the frame of rodent control measures in the early 21st century poisoned the prey base of carnivores and raptors. In the Sanjiangyuan region of the Tibetan Plateau, 54,147 km^{2} (20,906 1/4 sq mi) of grassland was poisoned between 2005 and 2009, leading to an estimated loss of 50,000–80,000 tonnes (55,000–88,000 short tons) of pika biomass. Pallas's cat may be negatively affected by habitat fragmentation due to mining and infrastructure projects.

== Conservation ==
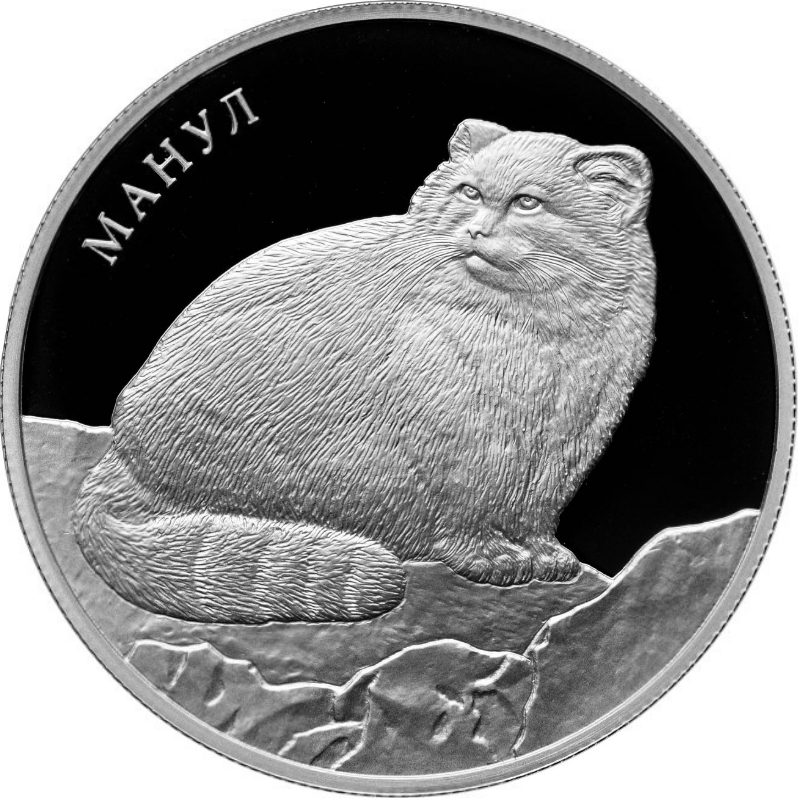
Pallas's cat on the Russian Federation two-ruble coin, silver, reverse.

Pallas's cat is classified as Least Concern on the IUCN Red List since 2020 because of its widespread range and assumed large global population. It is listed in CITES Appendix II. Hunting it is prohibited in all range countries except Mongolia. Since 2009, it is legally protected in Afghanistan, where all hunting and trade with its body parts is banned. On the Mongolian Red List of Mammals, it is listed as Near Threatened since 2006. In China, it is listed as Endangered. In Turkmenistan, it is proposed to be listed as Critically Endangered due to the scarcity of contemporary records.

=== In captivity ===
Between 1951 and 1979, the Beijing Zoo kept 16 Pallas's cats, but they lived for less than three years. In 1984, Pallas's cat was designated as a priority species for captive breeding of the American Association of Zoos and Aquariums's Species Survival Plan. Almost half of the kittens born in member zoos died within the first 30 days, reaching the highest mortality rate in captivity of any small wild cat.

Zoos in the former Soviet Union received most of the wild-caught Pallas's cats from the Transbaikal region and a few from Mongolia. Moscow Zoo initiated a studbook for Pallas's cat in 1997. Since 2004, Pallas's cat international studbook has been managed by the Royal Zoological Society of Scotland, which also coordinates the captive breeding program for Pallas's cat within the European Endangered Species Programme. As of 2018, 177 Pallas's cats were kept in 60 zoos in Europe, Russia, North America and Japan.

In 2011, a female Pallas's cat was artificially inseminated for the first time with semen from the male at the Cincinnati Zoo. After 69 days, she gave birth to four kittens, of which one was stillborn.

== In popular culture ==
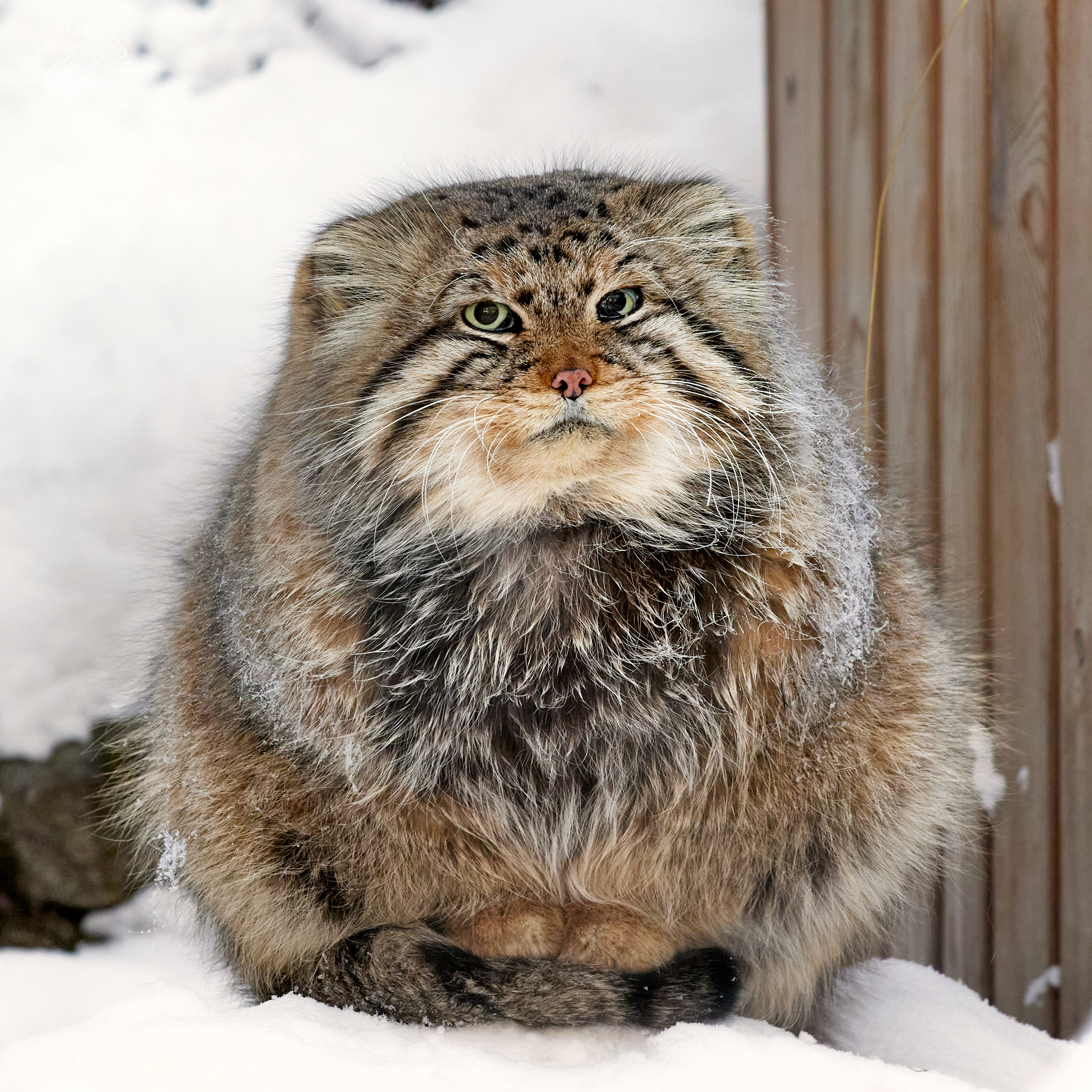
Zelenogorsk in 2024

Pallas's cat is featured in a Russian Internet meme known as "Pet the cat" introduced in 2008; the meme is a picture of a Pallas's cat that invites the reader to pet it in the image's caption. In 2012, Pallas's cat became the mascot of Moscow Zoo. Zelenogorsk was a Pallas's cat at Novosibirsk Zoo in Russia who became popular on the internet following footage of him putting his paws on his tail.
