= Alpine steppe =

High altitude natural alpine grassland

Alpine-steppe
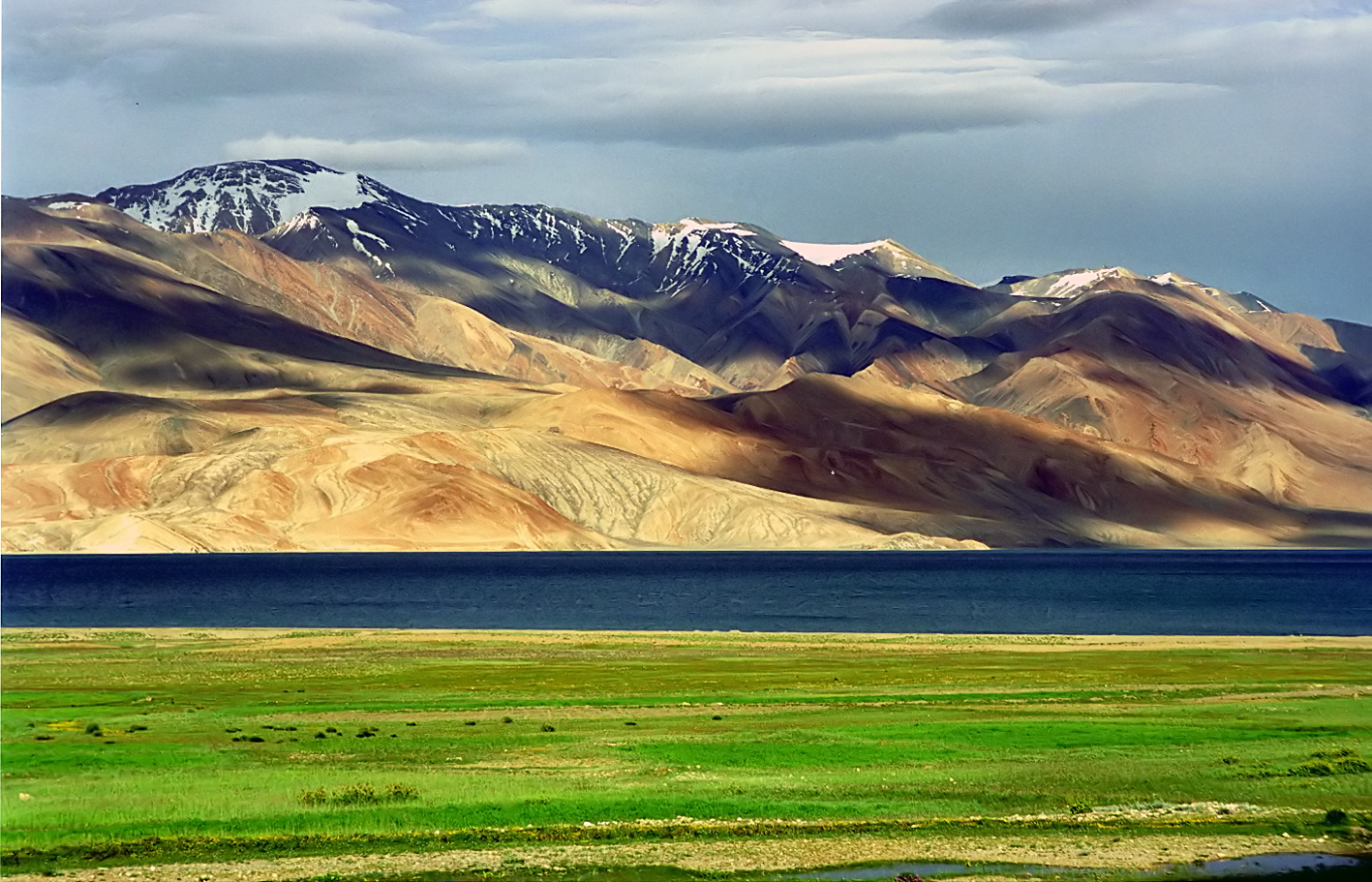
- Karakoram-West Tibetan Plateau alpine steppe

Ecology
- Biome: Montane grasslands and shrublands

Geography
- Climate type: Arid

The Alpine-steppe is a high altitude natural alpine grassland, which is a part of the Montane grasslands and shrublands biome.

Alpine-steppes are unique ecosystems found throughout the world, especially in Asia, where they make up 38.9% of the total Tibetan Plateau grassland's area.

== Characteristics ==
Alpine grasslands, like the Alpine-steppe, are characterized by their intense radiation, with direct solar radiation periods averaging 2916 hours annually. The average temperature in this ecosystem is very low. For example, they may experience temperatures around −10 °C in winter, and 10 °C in summer. Winters also tend to be long and cold, and summers are mild and short. This ecosystem also experiences year-long frost, with no reported frost-free season.

The annual rates of precipitation in Alpine-steppes are very low, with mean ranges falling anywhere between 280 and 300 mm. In addition, upwards to 80% of this falls between the months of May and September, causing the climate to be arid or semi-arid, making the environment much harsher for plant and livestock life.

== Vegetation ==
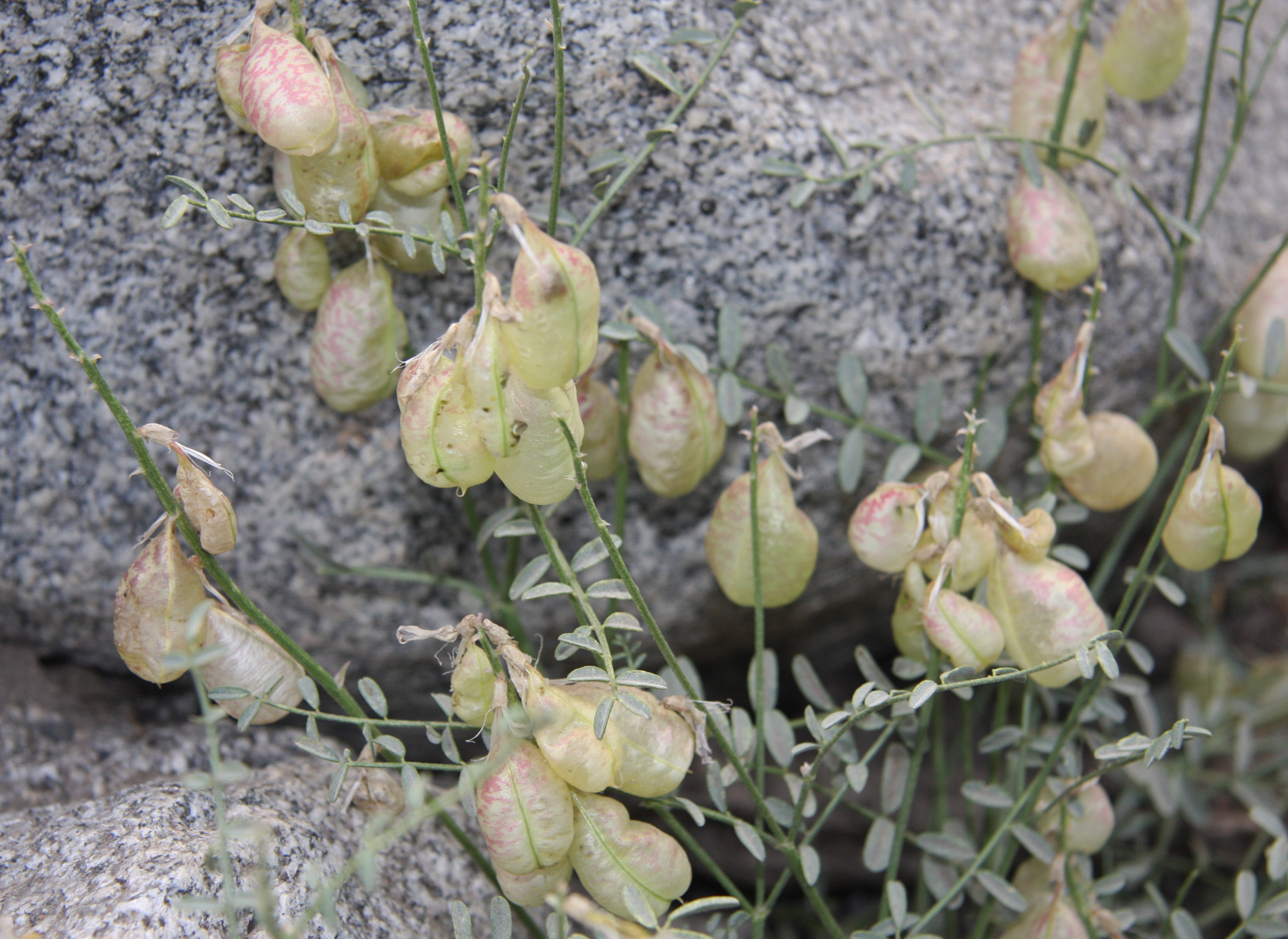
Locoweed in Tibet

Vegetation in the alpine steppe is very vulnerable to climate change. Average air temperature has been increasing by approximately 0.3 degrees Celsius every ten years since the 1960s. This is three times the global average, indicating the sensitivity of this area. Studies have been done that show that the spread of vegetation has changed dramatically since the Holocene period. The Tibetan Plateau is composed of three main regions, based on yearly precipitation levels and types of vegetation, namely the alpine meadow, alpine steppe, and the alpine desert-steppe. Since the Holocene, studies of fossil pollen records have shown that the alpine meadow has extended into areas that were previously alpine steppe as precipitation increased during that period. There is a unimodal pattern across precipitation and vegetation rain use efficiency (RUE), with an increasing trend in Alpine-steppe regions. RUE is lower here compared to the alpine meadow because of differences in species richness, soil texture, and soil carbon content.

Changes in vegetation have been used recently as an indicator of grassland degradation in the Tibetan Plateau, along with land desertification and decreased overall productivity. Vegetation shifts from non-poisonous to poisonous plants seem to correlate with increased land degradation. Plants defined as poisonous in the alpine grasslands area include species such as locoweed, which is known to be very invasive. Not only are poisonous plants an indicator of decline, they result in increased mortality of grazing animals. This invasion of poisonous species is spread across all regions of the Tibetan Plateau, but the alpine steppe is the most affected area.

The Tibetan Plateau is an extremely important area for livestock farming, and historically overgrazing has been as issue with regard to the sustainability of the vegetation in the area. Measures have been taken to regulate the use of these grasslands, including the implementation of protected or 'fenced areas'. While these measures are certainly a step in the right direction as far as sustainability legislation, they have not been shown to have a very strong effect on the above ground net primary productivity (ANPP).

== Soil and biome composition ==
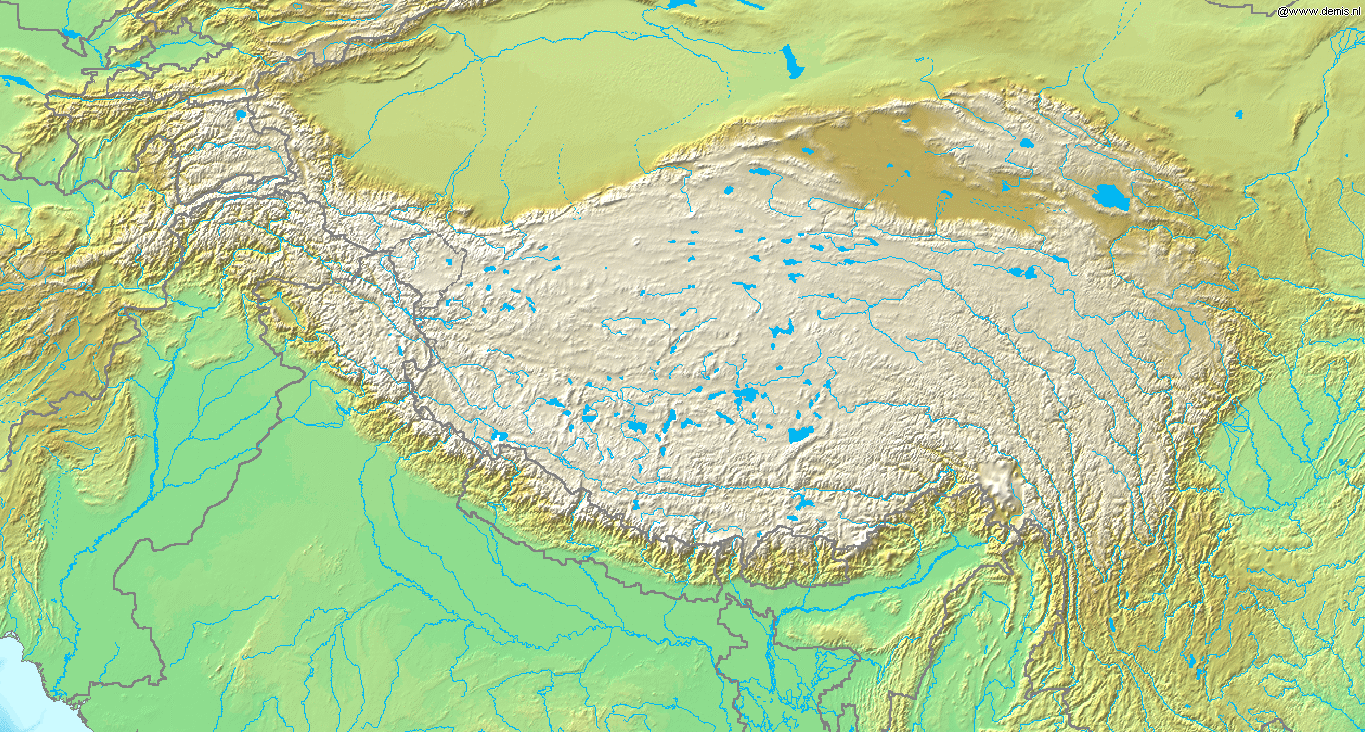
Topographic map of Tibetan Plateau

Based on studies done in the alpine steppe region of the Tibetan Plateau, different soil nutrients have differential effects on the nutrient composition and uptake of plants in the area. Soil phosphorus seems to have a much more significant impact on the nitrogen:phosphorus ratio in plants than soil nitrogen does. This type of finding can have implications for different nutrient conservation strategies among plant species in the same community, as plants seem to be more sensitive to changes in soil phosphorus than nitrogen, though nitrogen is still extremely important. What also makes this interesting is the fact that nitrogen is a limiting factor for plant growth, and so is actually critical for the overall health of the plant community. Grazing of herd animals has been shown to have a positive effect on the levels of nitrogen in the soil, though the return of nitrogen in the excrement. The addition of dung to the soils of this region in a laboratory setting resulted in increased availability of ammonia for plants (their primary nitrogen source). However, in an unaltered system, soil nitrogen tends to be more constant, whereas soil phosphorus is more influenced by climate variation, which may explain why, even though nitrogen is the limiting factor, phosphorus can be a greater influence on the N:P ratio of plant nutrients. alpine grassland temperature range from 14 degrees Fahrenheit in winter to 50 degrees Fahrenheit in summer

== Threats to Alpine-Steppes ==
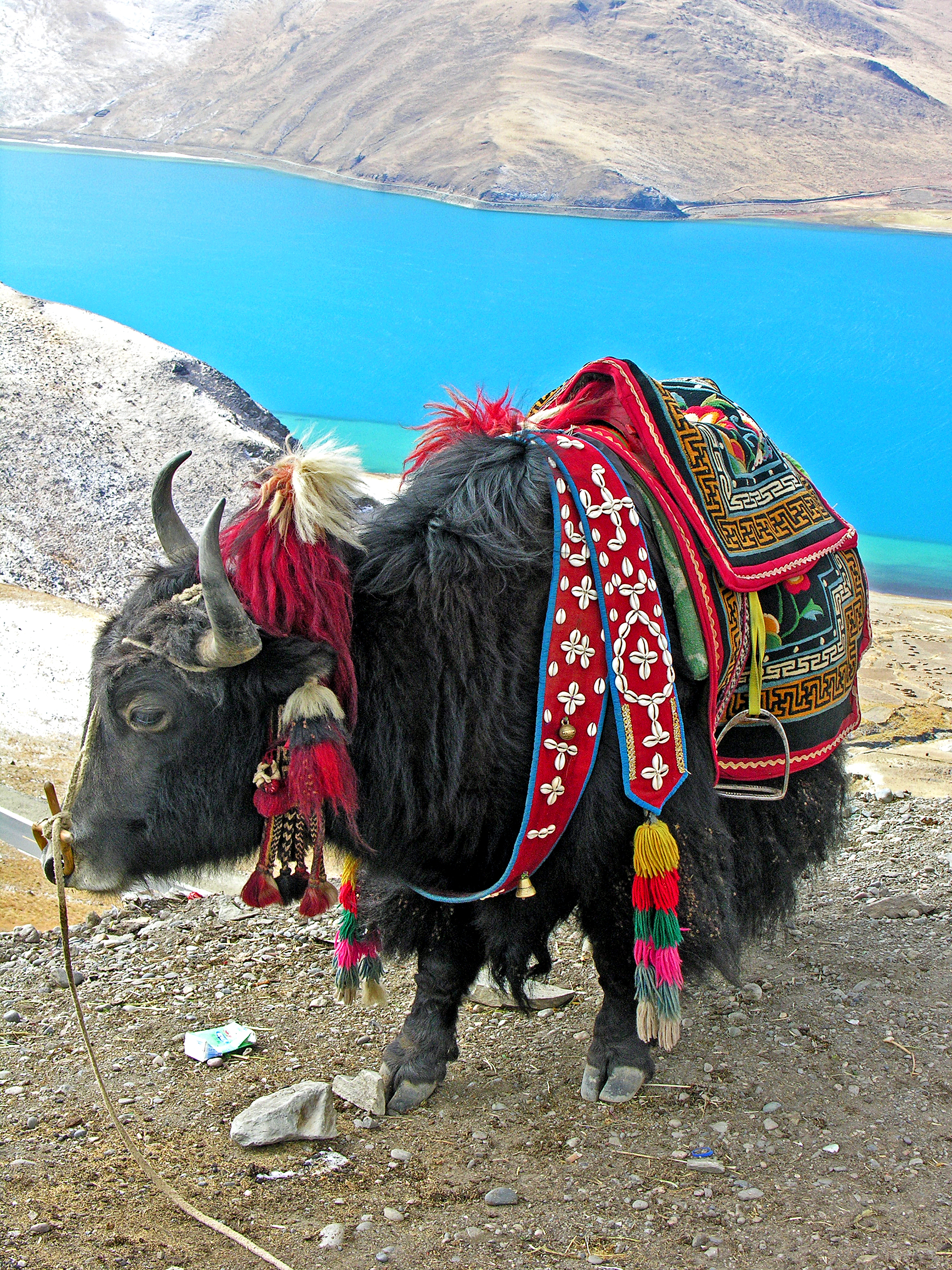
Yak in Tibet

Because of their elevation, alpine regions are thought to experience higher rates of warming, causing them to be more sensitive and vulnerable to global climate change. Other major threats to Alpine-Steppes include overgrazing, as well as land use change associated with increases in population size. Because of this, the authorities in areas throughout China are under pressure to implement programs to protect and preserve this fragile ecosystem.

One such program is the "Retire Livestock and Restore Pastures" initiative, which requires the use of special enclosure fencing. The purpose of this protective fencing is to prevent the grazing activity of large livestock, like sheep, yaks, and goats, in an attempt to restore the degraded biomass, and maintain ecosystem function. Often these effects can best be seen by the changes they produce in the biogeochemical properties of the soil. The overall goal is to improve ecosystem carbon, nitrogen, and phosphorus storage, by increasing both vegetation and soil pools of these elements. This effect is crucial because even a small percent change in carbon storage can have a huge positive impact on atmospheric carbon dioxide and global carbon levels, as well as ecosystem sustainability. But carbon is not the only important factor. Low levels of nitrogen and phosphorus have also been found to limit plant growth and net primary productivity. In one study, exclusion fencing was found to increase the carbon stored in the biomass, as well as the nitrogen and phosphorus in the above-ground biomass. However this effect was minor, and not enough to compensate for the considerable loss of carbon, nitrogen, and phosphorus pools from the soil surface layer. Another study found exclusion fencing to be a beneficial tool in lowering carbon dioxide emissions, and increasing methane consumption, which improves both the soil carbon and nitrogen stores. Although findings are controversial, enclosure fencing remains a common practice in China because of the sensitivity of these grassland areas.

== Examples ==
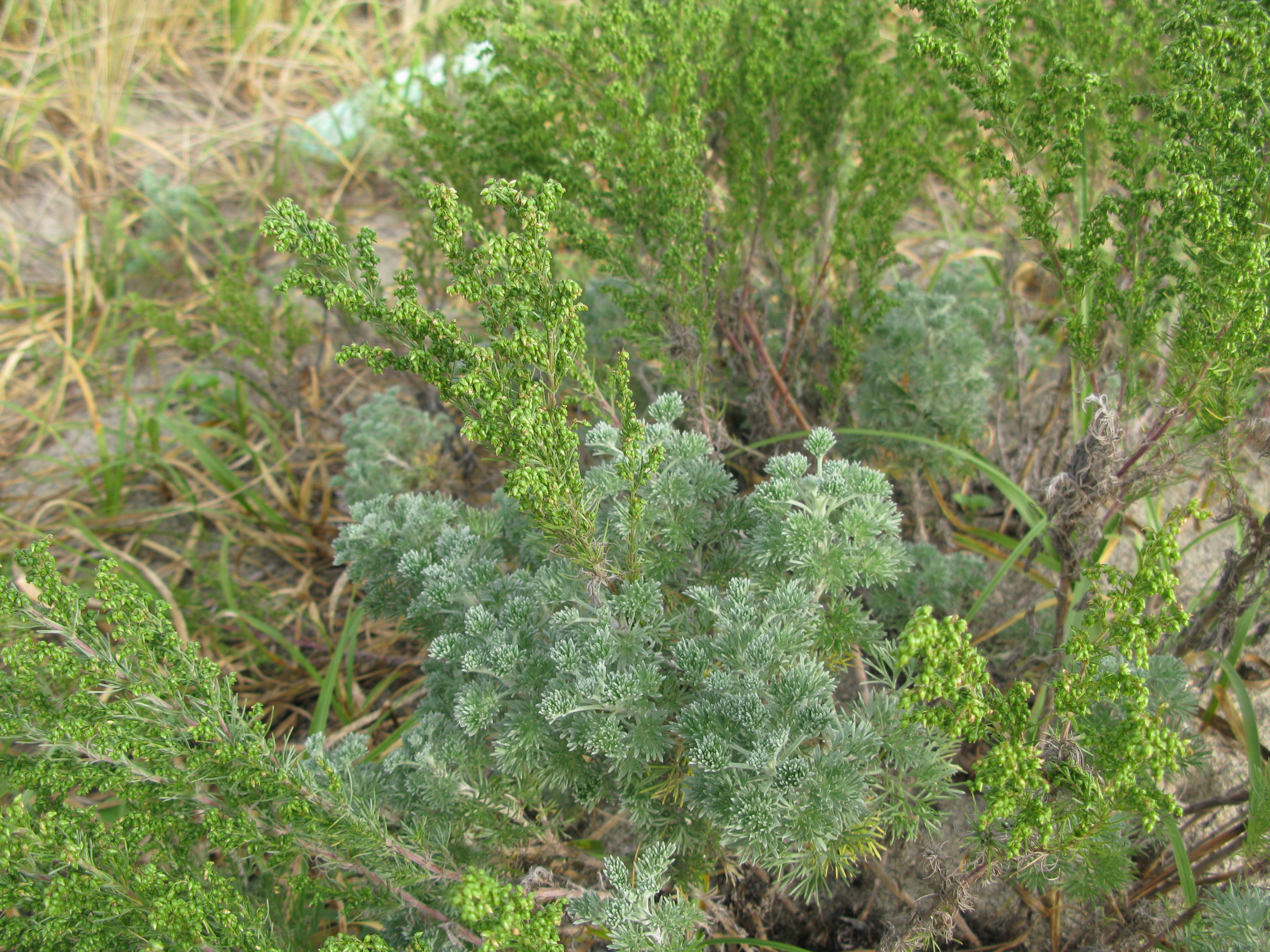
Artemisia capillaris

At an elevation of 4,500–6,000 m, Northern Tibet's area is covered by approximately 94% grasslands, including the alpine-steppe and alpine meadow. The alpine-steppe in this area has less than 20% vegetation coverage, which consists mainly of Stipa purpurea, Artemisia capillaris, and Rhodiola rotundaia assemblages. Compared to the alpine meadow, the alpine-steppe is cooler, arid or semi-arid, with little precipitation and barren soils. The highest vegetation carbon pool can be found in August, and nitrogen and phosphorus concentrations in the area exhibit seasonal variations throughout the growing period.

== See also ==
- Ecoregion
- Grasses
- Montane grasslands and shrublands – biome
