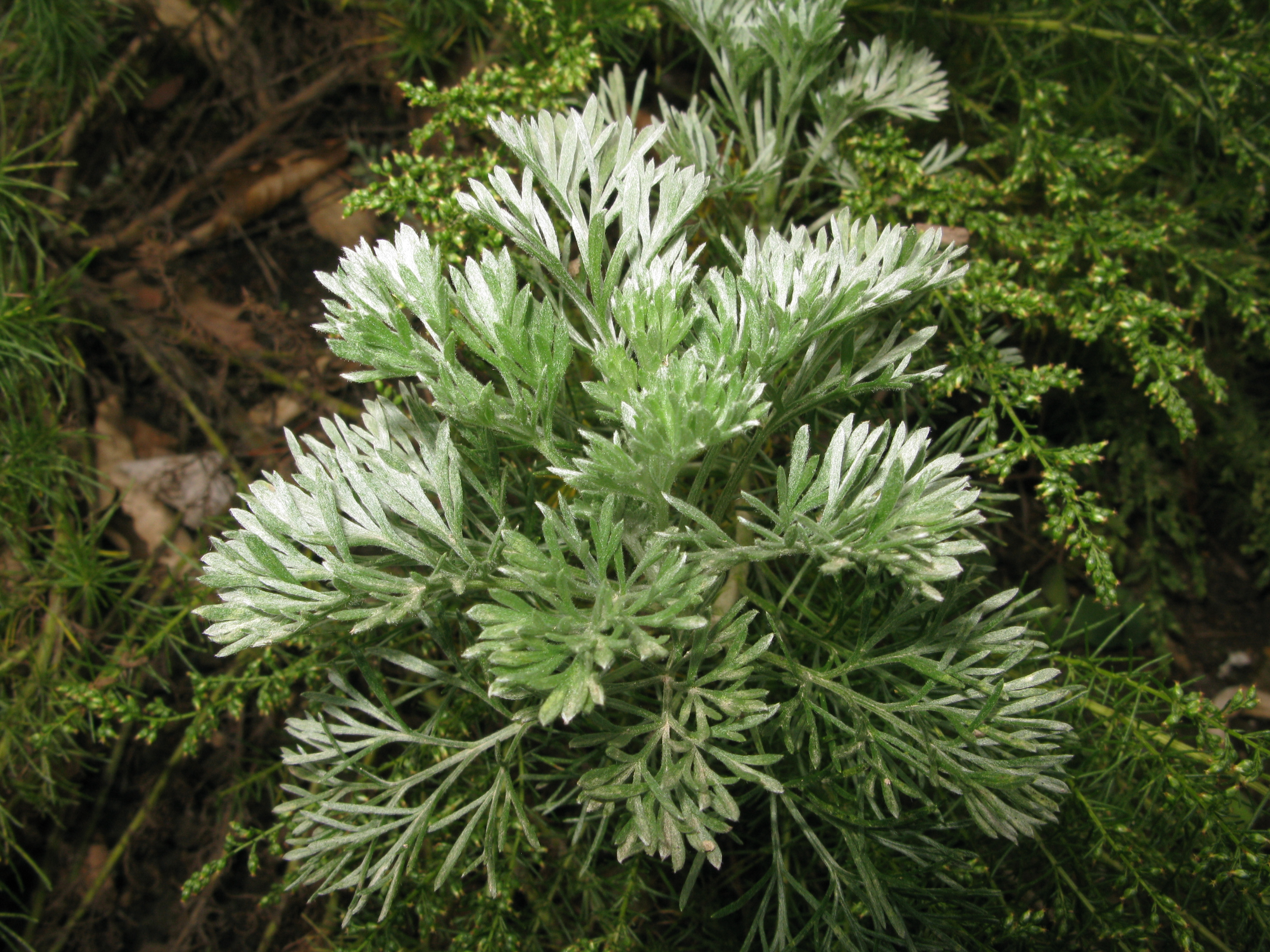
- Leaves

Scientific classification
- Kingdom: Plantae
- Clade: Embryophytes
- Clade: Tracheophytes
- Clade: Angiosperms
- Clade: Eudicots
- Clade: Asterids
- Order: Asterales
- Family: Asteraceae
- Genus: Artemisia
- Species: A. capillaris

Binomial name
- Artemisia capillaris Thunb.

Synonyms
- List: Absinthium mollissimum Besser; Artemisia capillaris var. acaulis Pamp.; Artemisia capillaris var. arbuscula Miq.; Artemisia capillaris f. glabra Pamp.; Artemisia capillaris var. sachalinensis (Tilesius ex Besser) Pamp.; Artemisia capillaris f. sericea (Nakai) Pamp.; Artemisia capillaris var. sericea Nakai; Artemisia hallaisanensis Nakai; Artemisia hallaisanensis var. formosana Pamp.; Artemisia hallaisanensis f. parvula Pamp.; Artemisia hallaisanensis var. philippinensis Pamp.; Artemisia hallaisanensis f. swatowiana Pamp.; Artemisia japonica f. vestita Pamp.; Artemisia mollissima D.Don; Artemisia sachalinensis Tilesius ex Besser; Draconia capillaris (Thunb.) Soják; Oligosporus capillaris (Thunb.) Poljakov

= Artemisia capillaris =

Species of flowering plant

Artemisia capillaris (Chinese: 茵陈蒿 yīn chén hāo), the capillary wormwood, is a species of flowering plant in the wormwood genus Artemisia, family Asteraceae.

Artemisia capillaris is a biennial or perennial herb, 30-80(100) cm tall with vertical, woody rootstock and usually a single to few, slender, erect, pale purplish or reddish brown, glabrous stems. Leaves are silky hairy, basal ones shortly petiolate, middle stem leaves almost sessile. Synflorescence is a narrow to wide panicle with many capitula composed of 8 to 12 yellow florets. Oblong-ovate, brown achenes are minuscule ca. 0.8 mm.

It is native to Pakistan, the western Himalayas, Assam, all of China, Mongolia, the Korean Peninsula, Irkutsk Oblast and Primorsky Krai in Russia, the Ryukyus, and Japan, and has been widely introduced to Afghanistan, India, Nepal, Southeast Asia, all of Malesia, and Taiwan.

It is used in traditional Chinese medicine.
