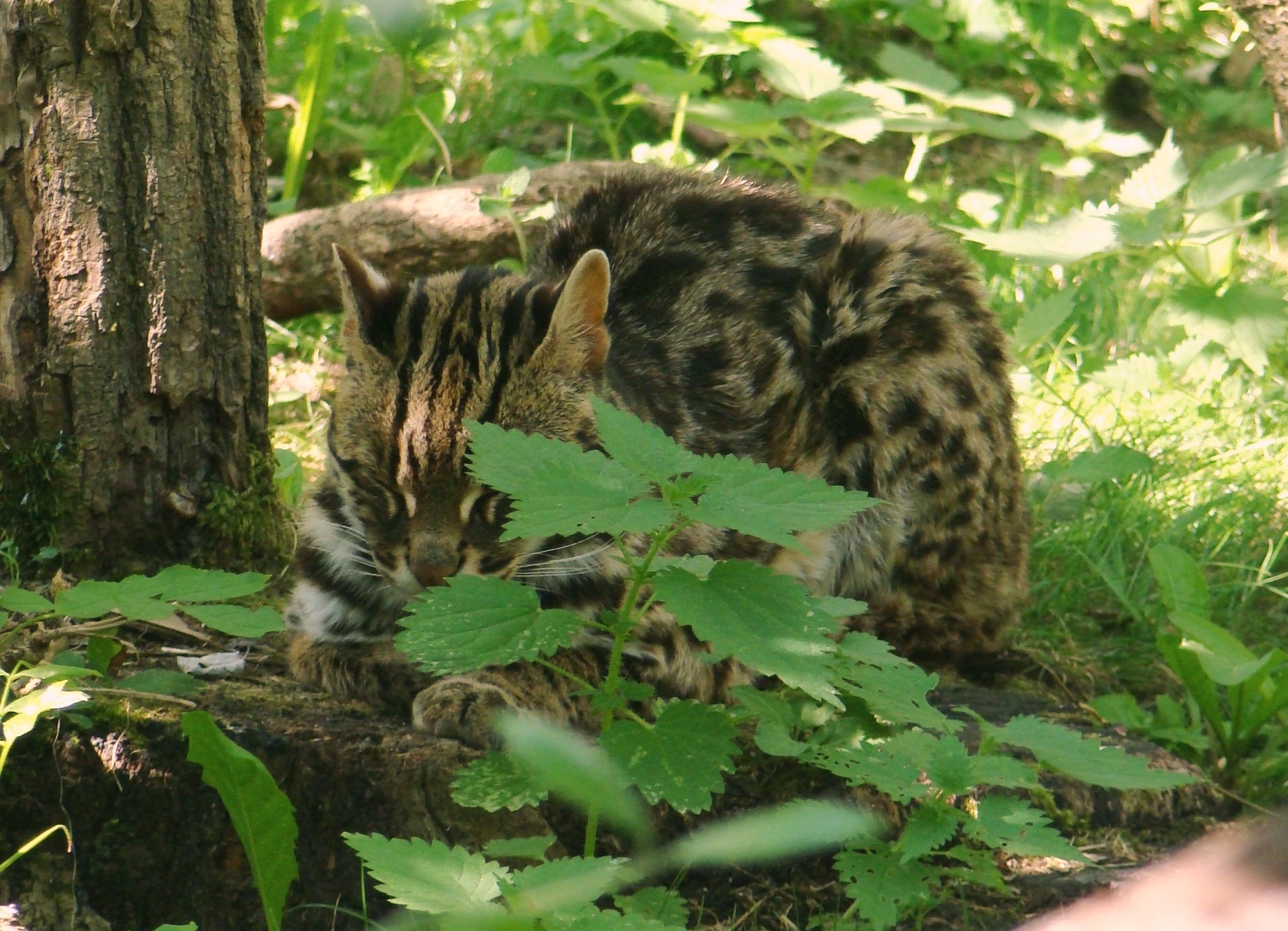
- Indian leopard cat (P. b. bengalensis)
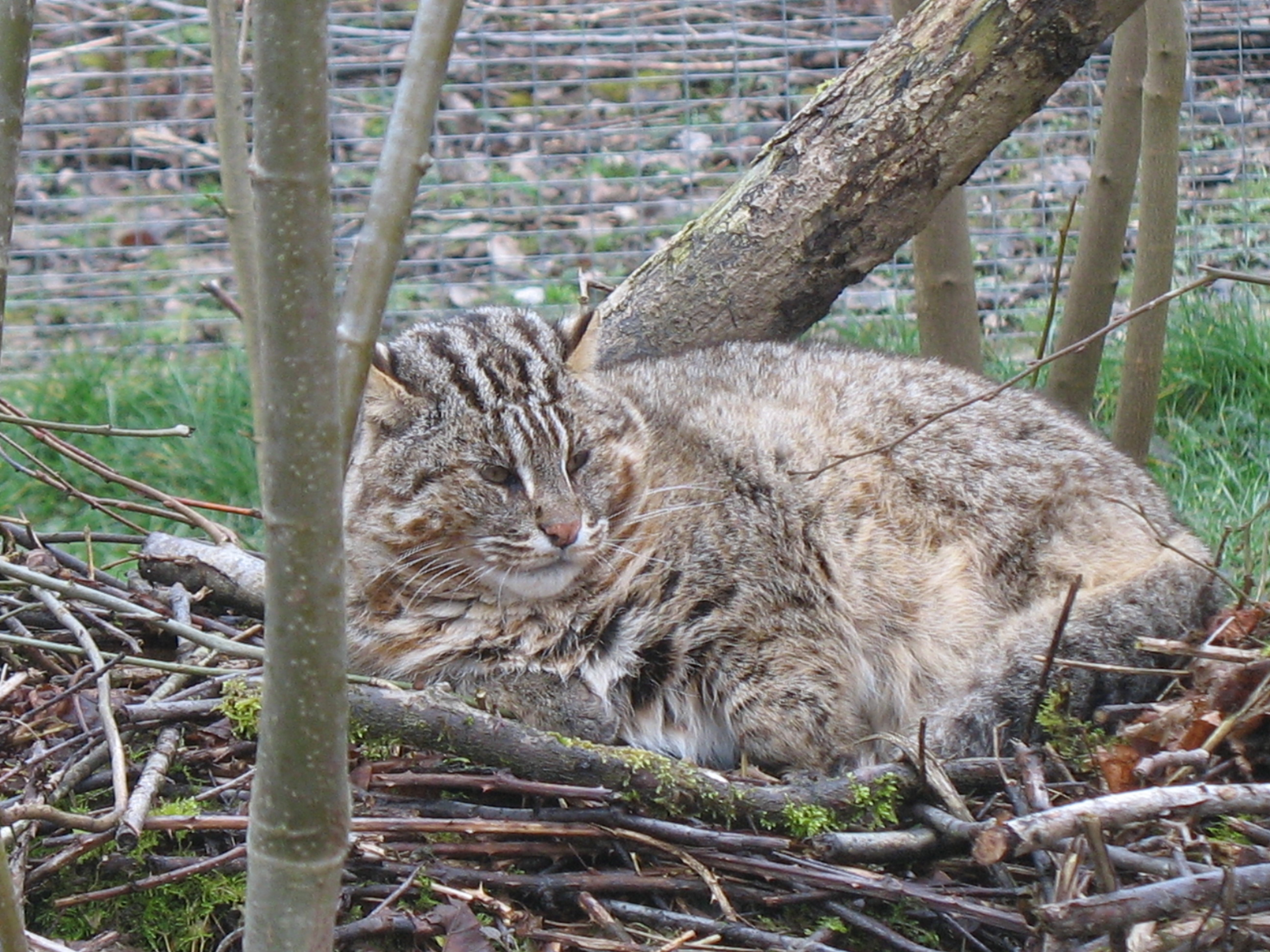
- Amur leopard cat (P. b. euptilura) both at the Parc des Félins

Conservation status
- Least Concern (IUCN 3.1)
- CITES Appendix II (Note: Prionailurus bengalensis bengalensis is listed in Appendix I.)

Scientific classification
- Kingdom: Animalia
- Phylum: Chordata
- Class: Mammalia
- Order: Carnivora
- Family: Felidae
- Genus: Prionailurus
- Species: P. bengalensis

Binomial name
- Prionailurus bengalensis (Kerr, 1792)

Subspecies
- P. b. bengalensis (Kerr, 1792); P. b. euptilura (Elliott, 1871)

= Leopard cat =

Small wild cat species

The leopard cat (Prionailurus bengalensis) is a small wild cat with dark spots on the tawny-coloured body and limbs. It has two dark stripes running from the eyes to the ears and smaller white streaks running from the eyes to the nose, and two to four rows of elongated spots along its back. Its tail is about half the size of its head-to-body length.

The leopard cat is native to continental South, Southeast and East Asia. It inhabits tropical evergreen rainforests, subtropical deciduous and coniferous forests up to an elevation of 4,474 m (14,678 ft) in the Himalayas. Since 2002 it has been listed as Least Concern on the IUCN Red List as it is widely distributed although threatened by habitat loss and hunting in parts of its range.

== Characteristics ==
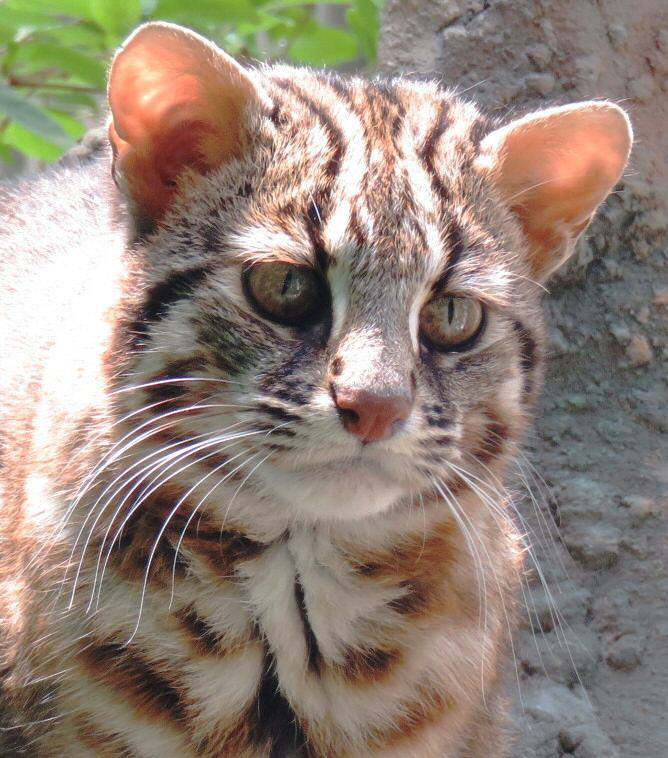
An adult leopard cat

A leopard cat is about the size of a domestic cat, but more slender, with longer legs and well-defined webs between its toes. Its small head is marked with two prominent dark stripes and a short and narrow white muzzle. There are two dark stripes running from the eyes to the ears and smaller white streaks running from the eyes to the nose. The backs of its moderately long and rounded ears are black with central white spots. Body and limbs are marked with black spots of varying size and colour, and along its back are two to four rows of elongated spots. The tail is about half the size of its head-body length and is spotted with a few indistinct rings near the black tip. The background colour of the spotted fur is tawny, with a white chest and belly. However, in their huge range, they vary so much in colouration and size of spots as well as in body size and weight that initially they were thought to be several different species. The fur colour is yellowish brown in the southern populations, but pale silver-grey in the northern ones. The black markings may be spotted, rosetted, or may even form dotted streaks, depending on subspecies. In the tropics, leopard cats weigh 0.55–3.8 kg (1.2–8.4 lb), have head-body lengths of 38.8–66 cm (15.3–26.0 in), with long 17.2–31 cm (6.8–12.2 in) tails. In northern China and Siberia, they weigh up to 7.1 kg (16 lb), and have head-body lengths of up to 75 cm (30 in); generally, they put on weight before winter and become thinner until spring. Shoulder height is about 41 cm (16 in).

Leopard cat subspecies differ widely in fur colour, tail length, skull shape and size of carnassials.

== Taxonomy ==
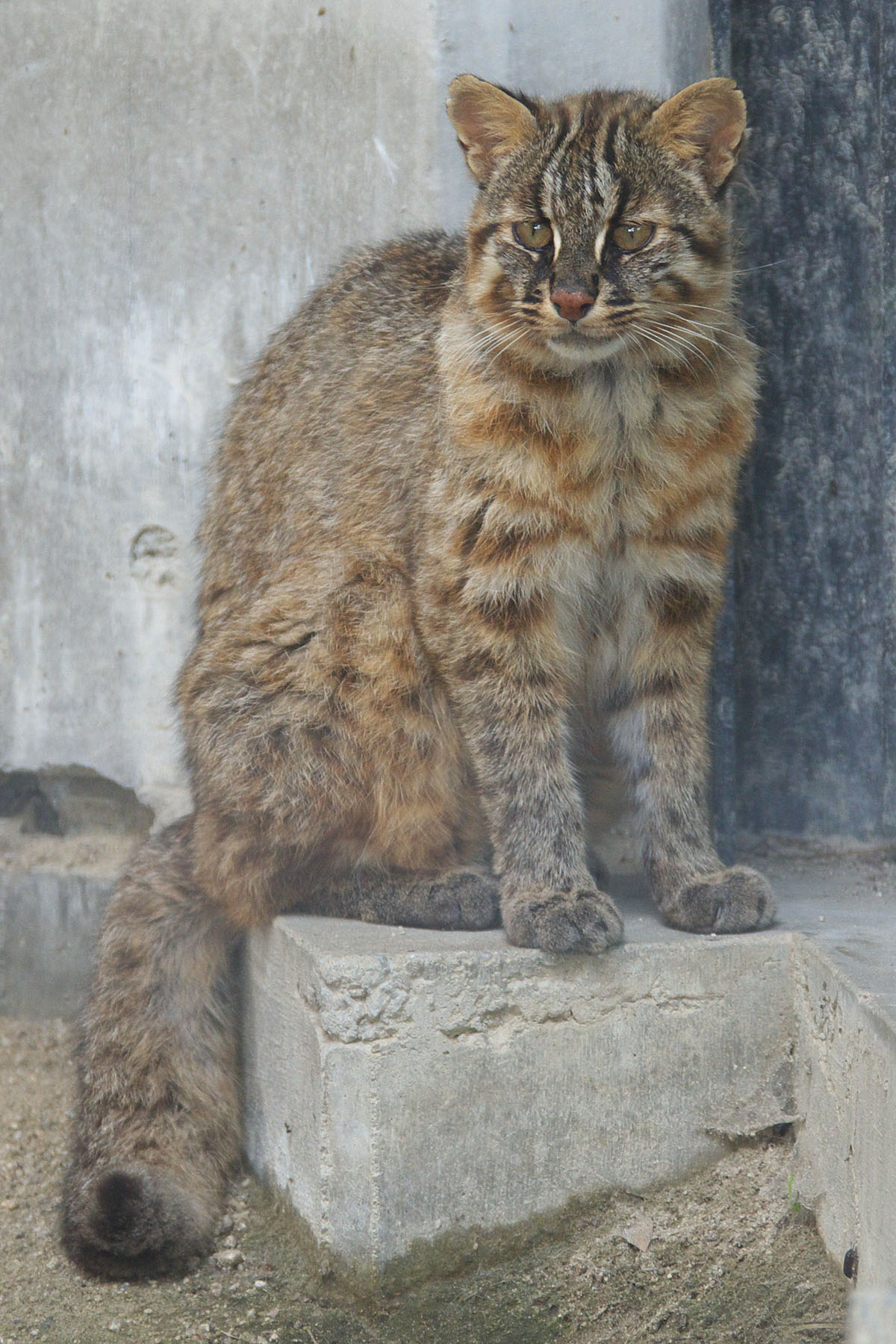
Tsushima leopard cat

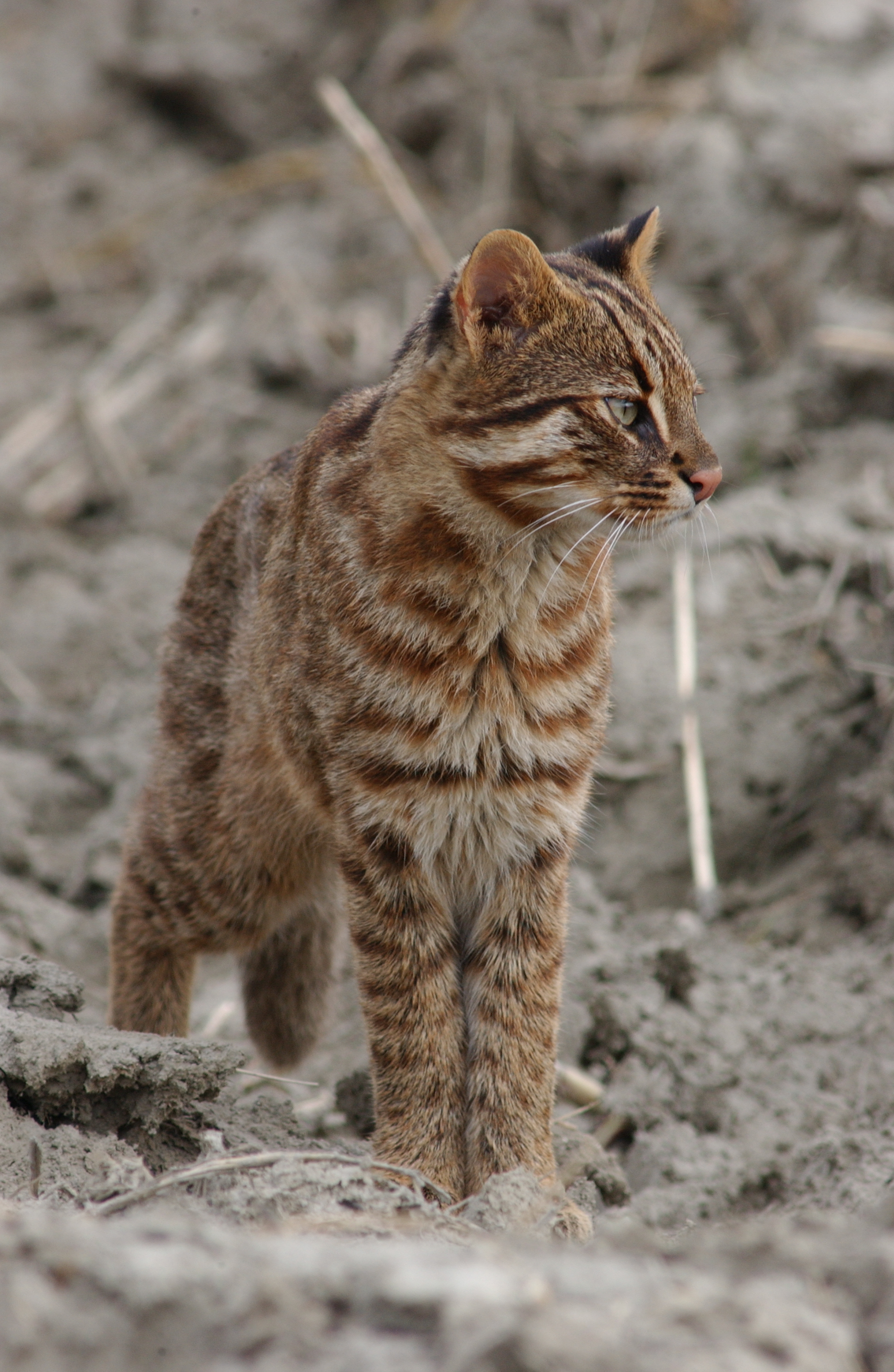
Leopard cat in South Korea

Felis bengalensis was the scientific name proposed by Robert Kerr in 1792 for a leopard cat from Bengal. In the subsequent decades, 20 more leopard cat specimens were described and named, including:

- Felis nipalensis (Horsfield & Vigors, 1829) from Nepal
- Felis chinensis (Gray, 1837) from Canton Province, China
- Leopardus ellioti (Gray, 1842) from the area of Bombay Presidency
- Felis horsfieldi (Gray, 1842) from Bhutan
- Felis wagati (Gray, 1867) and Felis tenasserimensis (Gray, 1867) from Tenasserim
- Felis euptilura (Elliot, 1871) based on two skins from Siberia. One was depicted in Gustav Radde's illustration cum description of a wild cat; the other was part of a collection at the Regent's Park Zoo. The ground colour of both was light brownish-yellow, strongly mixed with grey and covered with reddish-brown spots, head grey with a dark-red stripe across the cheek. The initial binomial euptilura given by Elliott has been incorrectly changed to "euptilurus" by some later authors, but under the International Code of Zoological Nomenclature Article 31.2.1, nouns and noun phrases are not subject to gender agreement; at present, both terms appear in use, but only the spelling "euptilura" is correct.
- Felis microtis (Milne-Edwards, 1872) from the Peking area; and also from Tsushima Island.
- Felis manchurica (Mori, 1922) from the vicinity of Mukden in Manchuria was a light grey spotted skin.

In 1939, Reginald Innes Pocock subordinated them to the genus Prionailurus. The collection of the Natural History Museum, London comprised several skulls and large numbers of skins of leopard cats from various regions. Based on this broad variety of skins, he proposed to differentiate between a southern subspecies P. bengalensis bengalensis from warmer latitudes to the west and east of the Bay of Bengal, and a northern P. bengalensis horsfieldi from the Himalayas, having a fuller winter coat than the southern. His description of leopard cats from the areas of Gilgit and Karachi under the trinomen Prionailurus bengalensis trevelyani is based on seven skins that had longer, paler and more greyish fur than those from the Himalayas. He assumed that trevelyani inhabits more rocky, less forested habitats than bengalensis and horsfieldi.

Two more subspecies were proposed and described:

- P. b. alleni (Sody, 1949) from Hainan Island
- P. b. iriomotensis (Imaizumi, 1967), known as the Iriomote cat, from Iriomote Island in the Japanese archipelago; Initially, the Iriomote cat was recognised as a distinct species, but following mtDNA analysis in the 1990s was considered a leopard cat subspecies.

In the 1970s and 1980s, the Russian zoologists Geptner, Gromov and Baranova disagreed with this classification. They emphasized the differences of skins and skulls at their disposal and the ones originating in Southeast Asia, and coined the term Amur forest cat, which they regarded as a distinct species. In 1987, Chinese zoologists pointed out the affinity of leopard cats from northern China, Amur cats and leopard cats from southern latitudes. In view of the morphological similarities they did not support classifying the Amur cat as a species.

Molecular analysis of 39 leopard cat tissue samples clearly showed three clades: a northern lineage and southern lineages 1 and 2. The northern lineage comprises leopard cats from Tsushima Island, the Korean Peninsula, the continental Far East, Taiwan, and Iriomote Island. Southern lineage 1, comprising Southeast Asian populations, showed higher genetic diversity. Southern lineage 2 is genetically distant from the other lineages.

Following a revision of Felidae taxonomy in 2017, two leopard cat species are recognised, based on molecular analyses, morphological differences, and biogeographic separation:

- the mainland leopard cat (P. bengalensis) is widely distributed on mainland Asia, from Pakistan to Southeast Asia, China, and the Russian Far East.
- the Sunda leopard cat (P. javanensis) is native to Java, Bali, Borneo, Sumatra, Palawan, Negros, Cebu, Panay, and possibly the Malay Peninsula.

Two mainland leopard cat subspecies are also recognised:

- P. b. bengalensis (Kerr, 1792) ranges in South and East Asia, from Pakistan to China, and probably the Malay Peninsula; and
- P. b. euptilura (Elliott, 1871) is native to the Russian Far East, Manchuria, Korea, Taiwan, Iriomote and Tsushima Islands.

=== Phylogeny ===
Phylogenetic analysis of the nuclear DNA in tissue samples from all Felidae species revealed that the evolutionary radiation of the Felidae began in Asia in the Miocene around 14.45 to 8.38 million years ago. Analysis of mitochondrial DNA of all Felidae species indicates a radiation at around 16.76 to 6.46 million years ago.

The Prionailurus species are estimated to have had a common ancestor between 8.16 to 4.53 million years ago, and 8.76 to 0.73 million years ago. Both models agree in the rusty-spotted cat (P. rubiginosus) having been the first cat of this evolutionary lineage that genetically diverged, followed by the flat-headed cat (P. planiceps) and then the fishing cat (P. viverrinus). It is estimated to have diverged together with the leopard cat between 4.31 to 1.74 million years ago and 4.25 to 0.02 million years ago.

The following cladogram shows the phylogenetic relationships of the leopard cat as derived through analysis of nuclear DNA:

- Felidae
  - Felinae
    - - - Prionailurus
          - - - - Leopard cat
                - Fishing cat
              - Flat-headed cat
            - Rusty-spotted cat
        - Otocolobus
          Pallas's cat (O. manul)
    - other Felinae lineages
  - Pantherinae

Archaeological evidence indicates that the leopard cat was the first cat species domesticated in Neolithic China about 5,000 years ago in Shaanxi and Henan Provinces.

== Distribution and habitat ==
The leopard cat is the most widely distributed Asian small wild cat. Its range extends from eastern Afghanistan, northern Pakistan and large parts of the Indian subcontinent and Southeast Asia to the Russian Far East. It lives in tropical evergreen rainforests and plantations at sea level, in subtropical deciduous and coniferous forests in the foothills of the Himalayas at elevations above 1,000 m (3,300 ft). It tolerates human-modified landscapes with vegetation cover to some degree, and inhabits agriculturally used areas such as oil palm and sugar cane plantations.

In Afghanistan, the leopard cat was reported in the 1970s in the Kunar Valley and the Waygul forest of Dara-I-Pech District.

In Pakistan, it was recorded in the temperate forests of Murree Hills and the Kaghan Valley, and in the subtropical moist broadleaf forests of Margalla Hills.

In India, the leopard cat has been recorded in protected areas of the Himalayas and their foothills, of the Terai and Dooars, the Brahmaputra Valley, Garo Hills and in the southern part of the Western Ghats. In May 2024, a leopard cat was recorded in Pench Tiger Reserve for the first time.

In Nepal, a leopard cat was recorded in 2009 by a camera trap in Makalu-Barun National Park at an elevation of 3,254 m (10,676 ft). At least six individuals inhabit the survey area, which is dominated by associations of rhododendron, oak and maple. The highest elevation record was obtained in September 2012 at 4,474 m (14,678 ft) in Kanchenjunga Conservation Area.

In Thailand's Phu Khiao Wildlife Sanctuary, 20 leopard cats were radio-collared between 1999 and 2003. Home ranges of males ranged from 2.2 to 28.9 km^{2} (0.85 to 11.16 sq mi), and of the six females from 4.4 to 37.1 km^{2} (1.7 to 14.3 sq mi).

In China, it was recorded in the Changqing National Nature Reserve in the Qinling Mountains, in the Tangjiahe National Nature Reserve in the Min Mountains, in Wolong Nature Reserve and other protected areas in the Qionglai Mountains and Daliang Mountains between 2002 and 2008.

In far eastern Russia, it lives close to rivers, valleys and in ravine forests, but avoids areas with more than 10 cm (3.9 in) of snowfall.

In the Japanese archipelago, the leopard cat is currently restricted to the islands of Iriomote and Tsushima. Fossils excavated dating to the Pleistocene period suggest a broader distribution in the past.

== Ecology and behaviour ==
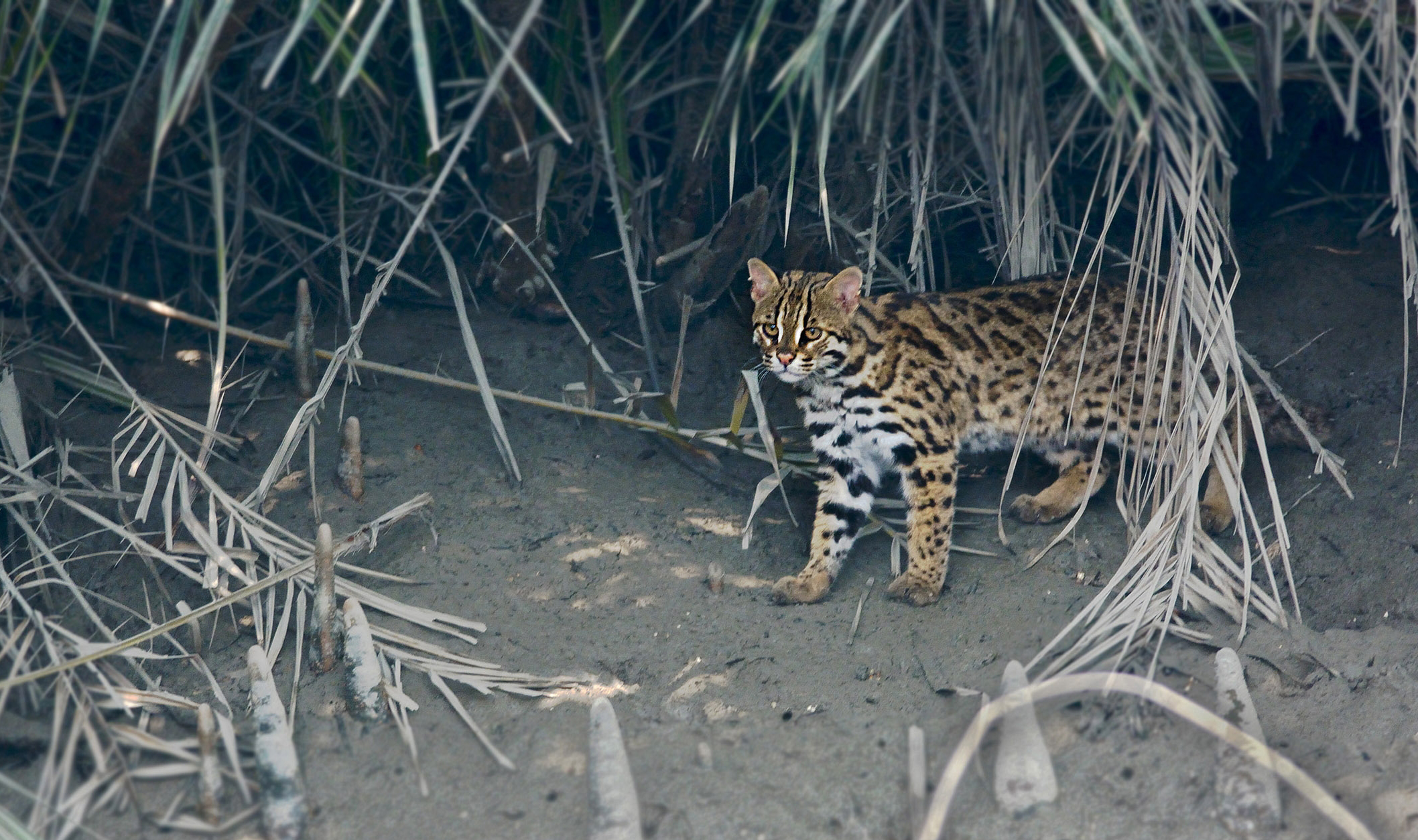
A leopard cat photographed in the Sundarbans, India

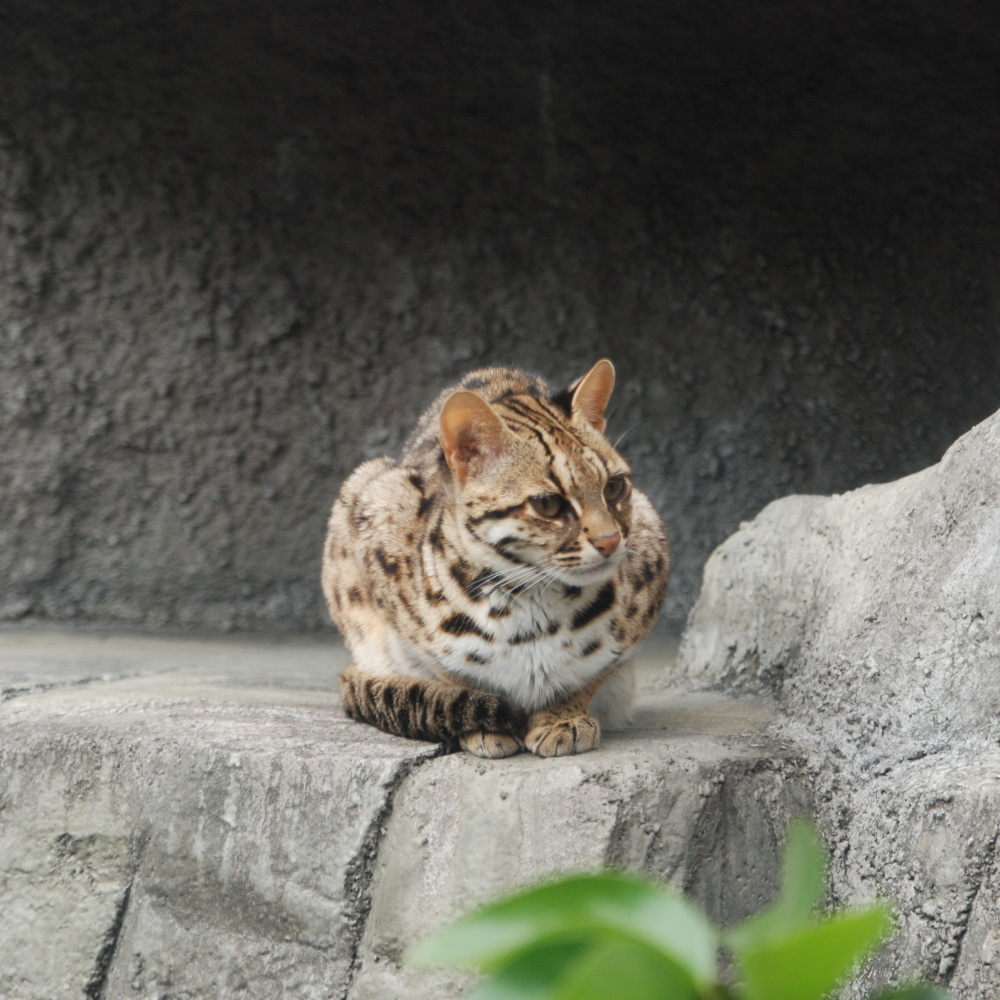
An alert leopard cat

Leopard cats are solitary, except during the breeding season. Some are active during the day, but most hunt at night, preferring to stalk murids, tree shrews and hares. They are agile climbers and quite arboreal in their habits. They rest in trees, but also hide in dense thorny undergrowth on the ground. There, leopard cats feed on a large proportion of rats compared to forested areas.

Leopard cats can swim, but seldom do so. They produce a similar range of vocalisations to the domestic cat. Both sexes scent mark their territory by spraying urine, leaving faeces in exposed locations, head rubbing, and scratching.

=== Diet ===
Leopard cats are carnivorous, feeding on a variety of small prey including mammals, lizards, amphibians, birds and insects. In most parts of their range, small rodents such as rats and mice form the major part of their diet, which is often supplemented with grass, eggs, poultry, and aquatic prey. They are active hunters, dispatching their prey with a rapid pounce and bite. Unlike many other small cats, they do not "play" with their food, maintaining a tight grip with their claws until the animal is dead. This may be related to the relatively high proportion of birds in their diet, which are more likely to escape when released than are rodents.

=== Reproduction and development ===
The breeding season of the leopard cat varies depending on the climate. In tropical habitats, kittens are born throughout the year. In colder habitats farther north, females give birth in spring. Their gestation period lasts 60–70 days. Litter size varies between two and three kittens. Captive-born kittens weighed 75 to 130 g (2.6 to 4.6 oz) at birth and opened their eyes by 15 days of age. Within two weeks, they double their weight and are four times their birth weight at the age of five weeks. At the age of four weeks, their permanent canines break through, and they begin to eat meat. Captive females reach sexual maturity earliest at the age of one year and have their first litter at the age of 13–14 months. Captive leopard cats have lived for up to 13 years.

== Threats ==
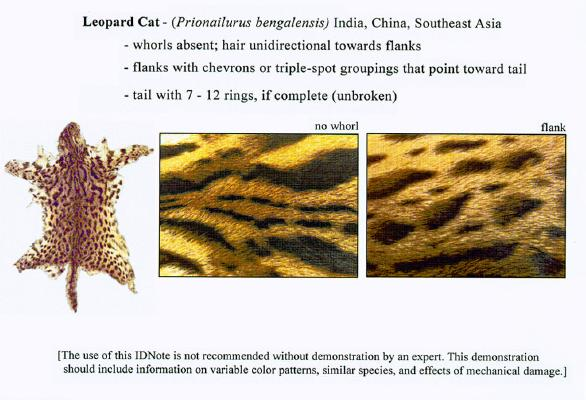
Skin and fur details from an identification guide for law enforcement agents

In China, leopard cats are hunted mainly for their fur. Between 1984 and 1989, about 200,000 skins were exported yearly. A survey carried out in 1989 among major fur traders revealed more than 800,000 skins on stock. Since the European Union imposed an import ban in 1988, Japan has become the main importing country, and received 50,000 skins in 1989. Although commercial trade is much reduced, the leopard cat continues to be hunted throughout most of its range for fur, food, and for sale as a pet. It is widely viewed as a poultry thief and killed in retribution.

In Myanmar, 483 body parts of at least 443 individuals were observed in four markets surveyed between 1991 and 2006. Numbers were significantly larger than non-threatened species. Three of the surveyed markets are situated on international borders with China and Thailand, and cater to international buyers, although the leopard cat is completely protected under Myanmar's national legislation. Implementation and enforcement of CITES is considered inadequate.

== Conservation ==
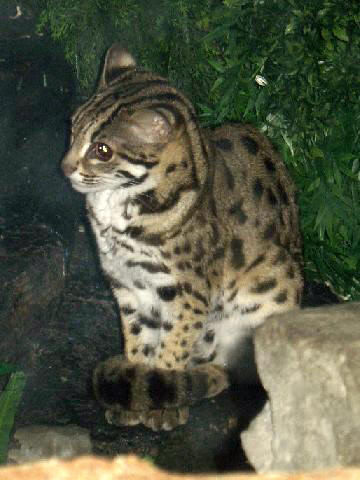
A leopard cat at the Bronx Zoo

The leopard cat is listed in CITES Appendix II. In Hong Kong, it is protected under the Wild Animals Protection Ordinance Cap 170. The population is well over 50,000 individuals and, although declining, the cat is not endangered.

The Tsushima leopard cat is listed as Critically Endangered on the Japanese Red List of Endangered Species, and has been the focus of a conservation program funded by the Japanese government since 1995. It is threatened by habitat loss, including from logging in the 1950s and 1960s, and a growing deer population which removes undergrowth that the Tsushima cat hunts for rodents in. The historical population has been split into two by the dividing of Tsushima island by a canal, and the southern population was thought extinct until a sighting in 2007. A recorded 122 individuals were killed by cars from 1992 to 2022. A captive breeding program has been initiated, but has not led to any successful reintroductions.

In the United States, the leopard cat is listed as Endangered under the Endangered Species Act since 1976; except under permit, it is prohibited to import, export, sell, purchase and transport leopard cats in interstate commerce. A permit is required for the import or exportation of the Asian leopard cat. Those who import/export without a CITES permit face large fines.

Leopard cats are considered an umbrella species, being the second most effective umbrella species for core habitat protection. The only animal ahead of the leopard cat as an effective umbrella species is the Asian elephant. Umbrella species' protection indirectly protects other species within its ecosystem. As an umbrella species, leopard cats play a role in the conservation of many species within its ecosystem, being more effective than larger predators. Along with being an umbrella species, leopard cats are indicator species, meaning their presence is an indicator of a healthy ecosystem. When leopard cats are present, their prey species are more controlled and larger predator species' health is improved, meaning the entire ecosystem is healthier.

== In culture ==
Fossil remains of leopard cats were excavated at Neolithic villages in Central China in 2001. Radiometric dating of these bones showed that they are at least 5,000 years old. These findings indicate that the leopard cat was a human commensal or domesticated in Neolithic China. They were later replaced with domestic cats that originated in the Middle East, some time before the Tang dynasty.

The Bengal cat is a cross breed between the leopard cat and the domestic cat that was introduced to cat shows in the 1970s. The fifth generation is marked like a leopard cat. This hybrid is usually permitted to be kept as a pet without a licence. The founding parents from the F1–F3 generations of breeding are usually reserved for breeding stock purposes or the specialty-pet home environment.
