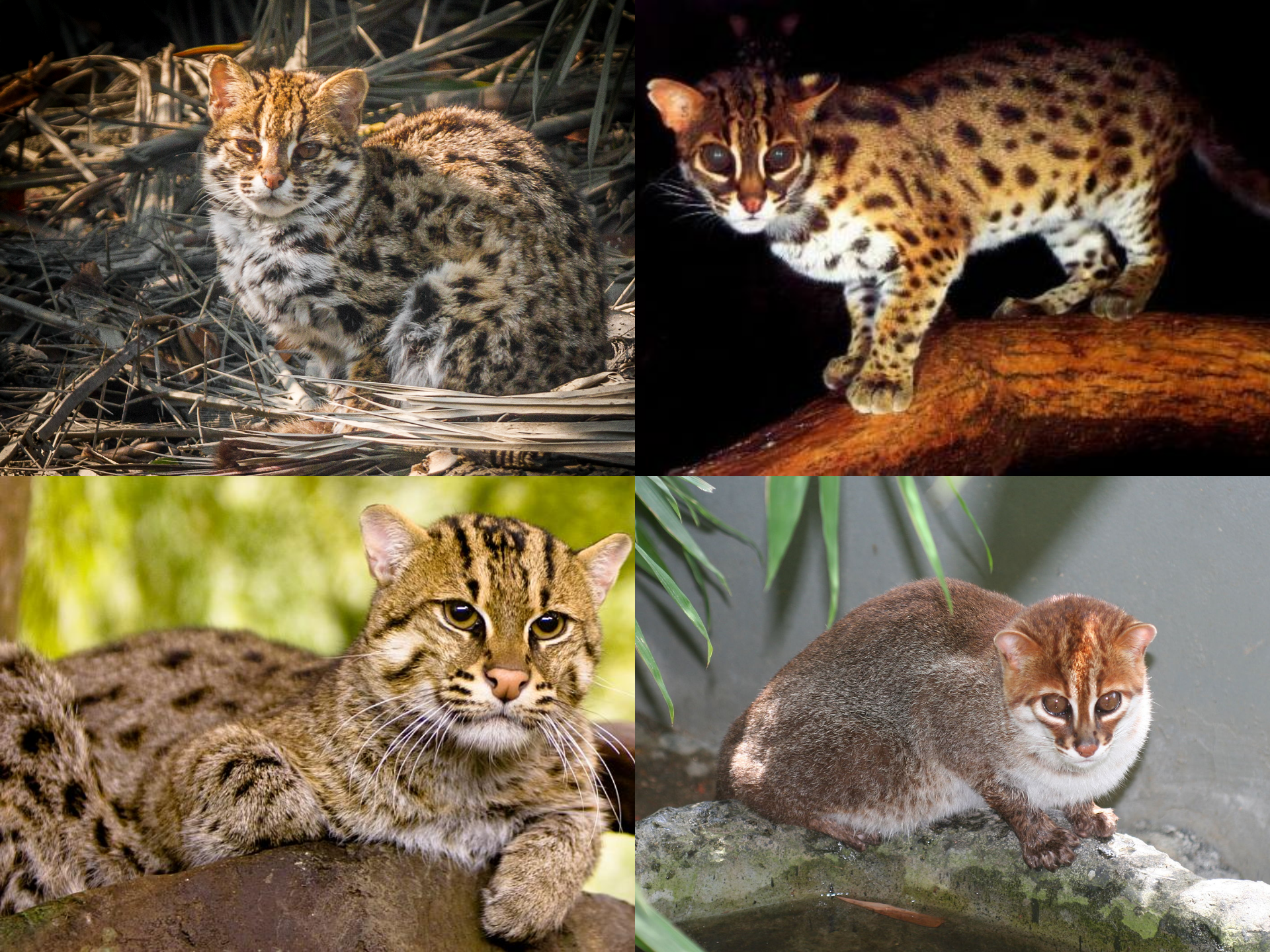
- Prionailurus species from top-left clockwise: Leopard cat (P. bengalensis), Sunda leopard cat (P. javanensis), flat-headed cat (P. planiceps), fishing cat (P. viverrinus)

Scientific classification
- Kingdom: Animalia
- Phylum: Chordata
- Class: Mammalia
- Order: Carnivora
- Family: Felidae
- Subfamily: Felinae
- Genus: Prionailurus; Severtzov, 1858

Type species
- Felis pardachrous Brian Houghton Hodgson, 1844 (= Felis bengalensis Kerr, 1792)

Species
- See text
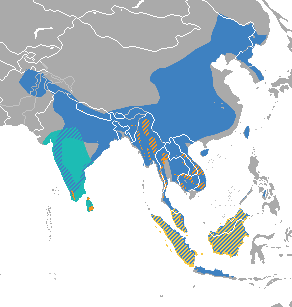
- Prionailurus ranges

= Prionailurus =

Prionailurus Temporal range: Pleistocene - Recent

Genus of carnivores

Prionailurus is a genus of spotted, small wild cats native to Asia. Forests are their preferred habitat; they feed on small mammals, reptiles and birds, and occasionally aquatic wildlife.

== Taxonomy ==
Prionailurus was first proposed by the Russian explorer and naturalist Nikolai Severtzov in 1858 as a generic name for a single felid occurring in tropical Asia, namely Felis pardachrous described by Brian Houghton Hodgson — the leopard cat. As varieties, Severtzov lists Felis nipalensis described by Thomas Horsfield and Nicholas Aylward Vigors, Leopardus Elliotti, Leopardus Horsfieldi and Leopardus chinensis described by John Edward Gray, and Felis bengalensis described by Anselme Gaëtan Desmarest.

The British zoologist Reginald Innes Pocock recognized the taxonomic classification of Prionailurus in 1917. In 1939, he described the genus on the basis of skins and skulls, and compared these to body parts of Felis. Pocock classified the leopard cat, rusty-spotted cat and fishing cat as belonging to the genus Prionailurus.

Pocock's classification of Prionailurus has been widely accepted, with five species now recognised:

Genus Prionailurus – Severtzov, 1858 – five species
Common name	Scientific name and subspecies	Range	Size and ecology	IUCN status and estimated population
Leopard cat	Prionailurus bengalensis (Kerr, 1792) Two subspecies: P. b. bengalensis (Kerr, 1792); P. b. euptilura (Elliott, 1871)	continental South, Southeast and East Asia.	Size: Habitat: Diet:	LC
Sunda leopard cat	Prionailurus javanensis (Desmarest, 1816) Two subspecies: P. j. javanensis (Desmarest, 1816); P. j. sumatranus (Horsfield, 1821)	Sundaland islands of Java, Bali, Borneo, Sumatra and the Philippines	Size: Habitat: Diet:	
Flat-headed cat	Prionailurus planiceps (Vigors & Horsfield, 1827)	Thai-Malay Peninsula, Borneo and Sumatra.	Size: Habitat: Diet:	EN
Fishing cat	Prionailurus viverrinus (Bennett, 1833)	South and Southeast Asia	Size: Habitat: Diet:	VU
Rusty-spotted cat	Prionailurus rubiginosus (Geoffroy Saint-Hilaire, 1834)	Nepal, India and Sri Lanka	Size: Habitat: Diet:	NT
Prionailurus kurteni	Prionailurus kurteni Jiangzuo et al., 2024	Anhui, China	Size: Habitat: Diet:	Fossil species

The fossil species Prionailurus kurteni was found in Pleistocene deposits of China.

Molecular analysis of leopard cat populations indicates a clear distinction between northern populations from Tsushima, Korea, Siberia, China and Taiwan and Southeast Asian populations. If these genetic differences indicate a specific distinction, P. b. euptilurus may yet be a valid species. The Iriomote cat (P. bengalensis iriomotensis) has been proposed as a distinct species based on morphology, but is considered a subspecies of P. bengalensis based on genetic analysis.

=== Phylogeny ===
Phylogenetic analysis of the nuclear DNA in tissue samples from all Felidae species revealed that the evolutionary radiation of the Felidae began in Asia in the Miocene around 14.45 to 8.38 million years ago. Analysis of mitochondrial DNA of all Felidae species indicates a radiation at around 16.76 to 6.46 million years ago. Both models agree in the rusty-spotted cat having been the first cat of the Prionailurus lineage that genetically diverged, followed by the flat-headed cat and then the fishing cat. It is estimated to have diverged together with the leopard cat between 4.31 to 1.74 million years ago and 4.25 to 0.02 million years ago.

The following cladogram shows their phylogenetic relationship as derived through analysis of nuclear DNA:

- Felidae
  - Felinae
    - - - Prionailurus
          - - - - Leopard cat
                - Fishing Cat
              - Flat-headed cat
            - Rusty-spotted cat
        - Otocolobus
          Pallas's cat (O. manul)
    - other Felinae lineages
  - Pantherinae
