= Prionailurus kurteni =

Prionailurus kurteni Temporal range: Middle Pleistocene

Scientific classification
- Kingdom: Animalia
- Phylum: Chordata
- Class: Mammalia
- Order: Carnivora
- Family: Felidae
- Genus: Prionailurus
- Species: †P. kurteni

Binomial name
- †Prionailurus kurteni Jiangzuo et al., 2024

Extinct species of mammal

Prionailurus kurteni is an extinct species of Prionailurus that inhabited China during the Middle Pleistocene.

== History and naming ==
Prionailurus kurteni was described based on a single specimen, IVPP V33075, a partial mandible with two teeth. The specimen was found in the late Middle Pleistocene locality Hualongdong Cave No. I Homo Site in Anhui Province, China. The specific name kurteni honors paleontologist Björn Kurtén.

== Description ==
The holotype of P. kurteni is a partial mandible with the fourth premolar and first molar intact. It is very small. It is described as a very small cat, comparable in size to South Asia rusty-spotted cat (Prionailurus rubiginosus) and African black-footed cat (Felis nigripes), whose head-and-body length reach at maximum 48cm (19in) and 52cm (20.5in), respectively..
