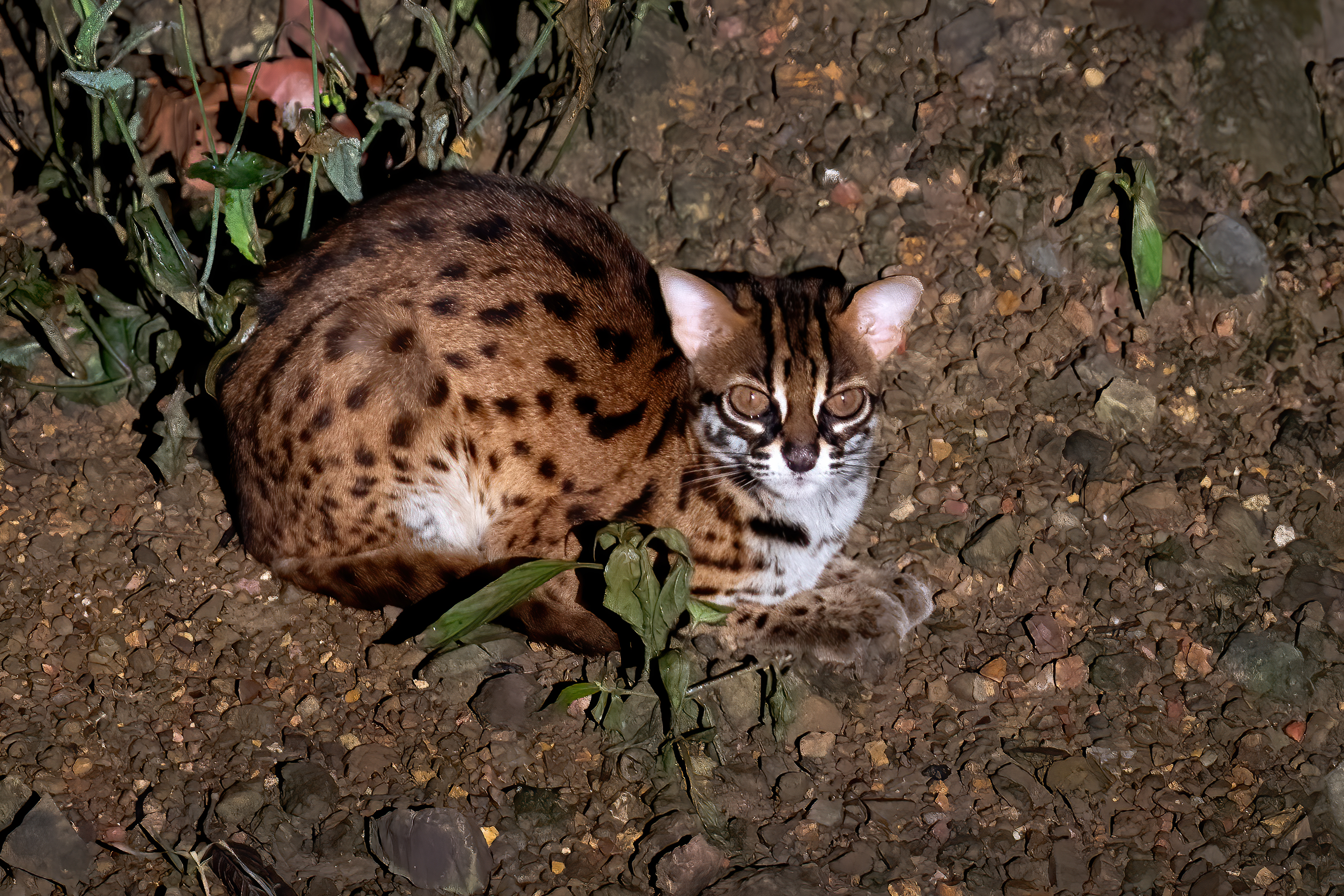

Scientific classification
- Kingdom: Animalia
- Phylum: Chordata
- Class: Mammalia
- Order: Carnivora
- Family: Felidae
- Genus: Prionailurus
- Species: P. javanensis

Binomial name
- Prionailurus javanensis (Desmarest, 1816)

Subspecies
- P. j. javanensis (Desmarest, 1816); P. j. sumatranus (Horsfield, 1821)
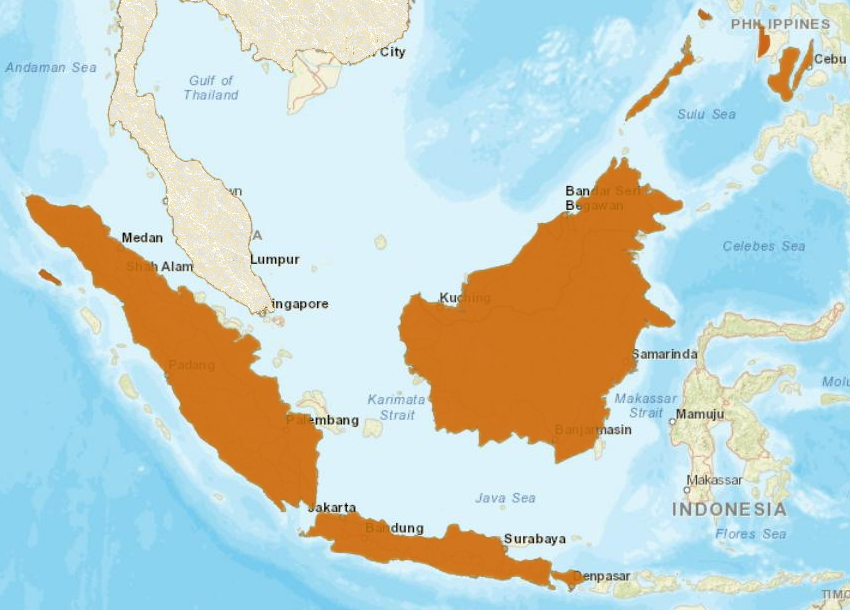
- Distribution of Sunda leopard cat, 2015

= Sunda leopard cat =

Small wild cat

The Sunda leopard cat (Prionailurus javanensis) is a small wild cat species native to the Sundaland islands of Java, Bali, Borneo, Sumatra and the Philippines that is considered distinct from the leopard cat occurring in mainland South and Southeast Asia.

== Characteristics ==
Desmarest described the Sunda leopard cat from Java as a little smaller than the domestic cat with brown round spots on grey-brown coloured fur above and whitish underneath, a line from above each eye towards the back and longish spots on the back. He noted the similarity to the leopard cat from India. Like all Prionailurus species it has rounded ears. Like its mainland relative, the Sunda leopard cat is slender, with long legs and well-defined webs between its toes. Its small head is marked with two prominent dark stripes and a short and narrow white muzzle. There are two dark stripes running from the eyes to the ears, and smaller white streaks running from the eyes to the nose. The backs of its moderately long and rounded ears are black with central white spots. Body and limbs are marked with black spots of varying size and color, and along its back are three rows of elongated spots that join into complete stripes in some subspecies. The tail is about half the size of its head-body length and is spotted with a few indistinct rings near the black tip. The background color of the spotted fur varies from light grey to ochre tawny, with a white chest and belly. There are two main variants in the coloration. The cats from Java, Bali and Palawan are a light grey, sometimes yellow-grey, with very small spots that may not be clearly defined. The three spotted lines along the back do not form complete stripes and are close together. Those from Sumatra, Borneo and Negros have a warm ochre toned background color and larger well-distinguished spots. The three longitudinal spot-lines are usually fused into stripes. Sunda leopard cats weigh 0.55 to 3.8 kg (1.2 to 8.4 lb), have head-body lengths of 38.8 to 66 cm (15.3 to 26.0 in) and tails about 40–50% of that length.

== Distribution and habitat ==
The Sunda leopard cat inhabits the islands of Sumatra, Borneo, Java, Bali, Tebingtinggi, Palawan, Negros, Cebu and Panay. Its natural habitat is lowland tropical evergreen forest, but it has also adapted to human-modified landscapes with suitable vegetation cover, and inhabits agricultural areas such as rubber, oil palm, and sugarcane plantations.

In Sabah's Tabin Wildlife Reserve, Sunda leopard cats had average home ranges of 3.5 km^{2} (1.4 sq mi).

In Kalimantan, Sunda leopard cats were recorded in mixed swamp forest and tall interior forest at elevations below 20 m (66 ft) in the vicinity of Sabangau National Park between 2008 and 2018.

== Taxonomy and evolution ==
Felis javanensis was the scientific name proposed by Anselme Gaëtan Desmarest in 1816 for a leopard cat from Java. In the 19th and 20th centuries, several leopard cat zoological specimens from the Sunda islands were described:

- Felis sumatranus by Thomas Horsfield in 1821 from Sumatra.
- Prionailurus bengalensis borneoensis by Leo Brongersma in 1935 from Borneo.
- P. b. heaneyi from the Philippine island of Palawan and
- P. b. rabori from Negros, Cebu and Panay, both in 1997 by Colin Groves, based on a morphological analysis of 147 skins and 100 skulls of leopard cats from insular and peninsular Southeast Asia.

Results of a phylogeographical study indicate that the Sunda leopard cat lineage diverged in the Middle Pleistocene. The Borneo population is thought to have expanded to Sumatra and the Philippines island of Palawan after the Toba eruption, when these islands were connected during the late Pleistocene glaciation. Since leopard cats in Palawan and Negros show low genetic differentiation, it is possible that humans introduced the leopard cat from Palawan to Negros and adjacent islands.

The Sunda leopard cat was formally reclassified as a distinct species in 2017, and two subspecies are recognised:

- P. j. javanensis
- P. j. sumatranus

== Ecology and behaviour ==
Sunda leopard cats photographed by camera traps in Kalimantan between 2008 and 2018 were foremost nocturnal, overlapping with the activity pattern of flat-headed cats (Prionailurus planiceps). Those recorded in an oil palm plantation in central Kalimantan were active from late afternoon to early morning and preyed foremost on ricefield rats and other rodents.

Nine radio-collared Sunda leopard cats in Sabah used predominantly oil palm plantations and also logged dipterocarp forest adjacent to the Tabin Wildlife Reserve. They were observed up to 4 m (13 ft) above ground hunting rodents and beetles, and preyed foremost on Whitehead's spiny rat, dark-tailed tree rat, long-tailed giant rat, lizards, snakes and frogs. Males had larger home ranges than females, averaging 3.5 km^{2} (1.4 sq mi) and 2.1 km^{2} (0.81 sq mi), respectively. Each male's range overlapped one or more female ranges. Fecal samples collected of Sunda leopard cats in sugarcane fields in Negros island indicate that they feed foremost on rodents such as house mouse, Polynesian rat, ricefield rat and tanezumi rat. To a lesser extent, they also prey on amphibians, geckos, lizards and passerine birds occurring in these sugarcane fields.

In western Java, Sunda leopard cats were encountered close to human settlements and resting on the ground.

== Threats ==
In Java and Bali, 219 Sunda leopard cats were recorded in 21 of 27 wildlife markets surveyed between 1996 and 2018. More than half were kittens, indicating they were caught in the wild. Numbers offered decreased from the 1990s surveys to 2018. In Sumatra, it is threatened by habitat loss following deforestation.
