= Parc des Félins =

Zoo in France

- Park logo
- Interactive map of Parc des Félins
- 48.709456°N 2.956738°E
- Date opened: October 14, 2006
- Location: Lumigny-Nesles-Ormeaux, Seine-et-Marne, France
- Land area: 60 hectares (148 acres)
- No. of animals: 140
- No. of species: 30
- Memberships: EAZA
- Website: www.parcs-zoologiques-lumigny.fr/univers/parc-des-felins/

Parc des Félins is a zoological park in France dedicated to the breeding and conservation of wild members of the cat family. It is located in the commune of Lumigny-Nesles-Ormeaux in Seine-et-Marne, about 53.6 km (33.3 mi) southeast of Paris.

The park covers an area of 60 hectares (150 acres). Of the 41 recognized species of felines in the world, the park has 30 different species and subspecies, with a total of 140 cats.

The park opened to the public on 14 October 2006. Originally, the majority of the animals came from the Parc d'Aulneau, which was deemed too small to house this many animals.

== History ==
- 1998: The Parc d'Aulneau opens.
- 2005: The Parc d'Aulneau becomes too small and a new place is sought.
- 2006: The location of the park is chosen at the height of Fortelle at Nesles in Seine-et-Marne.
- 2007: The park accommodates a wildcat, two leopard cats, two sand cats, a Siberian tiger, two margays, two oncillas and two rusty-spotted cats.

== Visiting the park ==
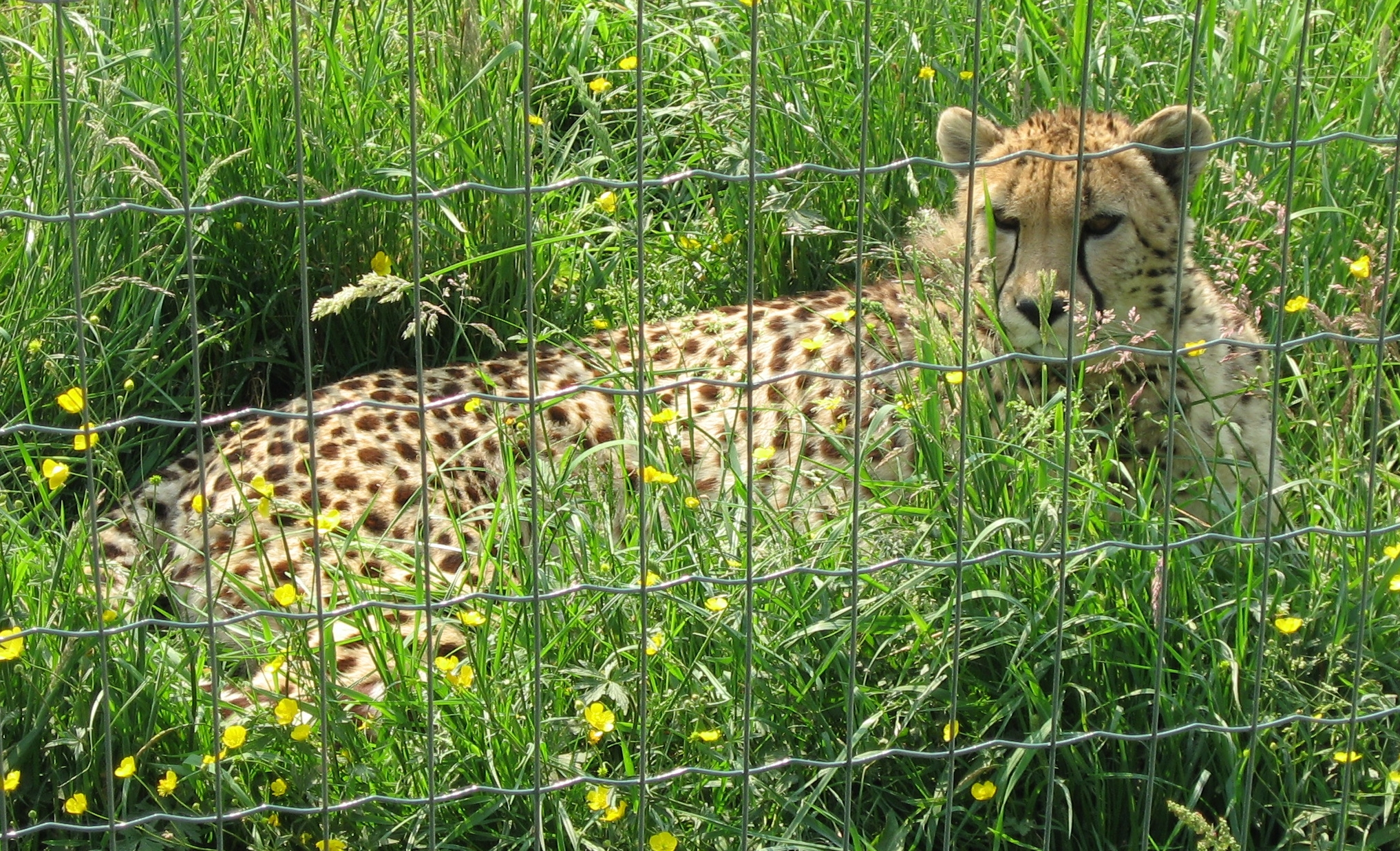
A cheetah at the park

The park's philosophy is to provide for the well-being of the animals, and to provide an environment conducive to their reproduction. The enclosures were studied in depth to ensure the optimal environmental conditions of each animal.

The park is divided into four geographic areas. Each animal's area is accompanied by an illustrated board with the name and description of the animal, the specifics of the animal's enclosure, and the dangers the animal faces in its natural environment.

=== European circuit ===
The European circuit begins at the enclosure of the cheetahs. There are only two enclosures in this circuit, located in the woods, and they are occupied by wildcats (Felis silvestris silvestris) and Eurasian lynx (Lynx lynx lynx).

=== African circuit ===
Map of the park

At the start of the visit, one begins with the Southeast African cheetahs, which have an enclosure roomy enough for them to run. At the end of the cheetah enclosure, the European circuit begins to the left. By going straight on the African circuit, visitors travel along to the African lion enclosure. At the end of the enclosure, one can either turn and start the Asian circuit to the right or start the American circuit to the left.

The African circuit continues to the left and the first enclosure is occupied by servals. On both sides of the way, visitors first see the sand cats, then the African wildcats and the Persian leopards, and finally the caracals.

The circuit concludes with the white lions, a rarity in zoos, followed by the black panthers, and finally the lions.

The park will house black-footed cats in the near future – their enclosures are currently ready and are home to the zoo's fishing cats.

=== American circuit ===
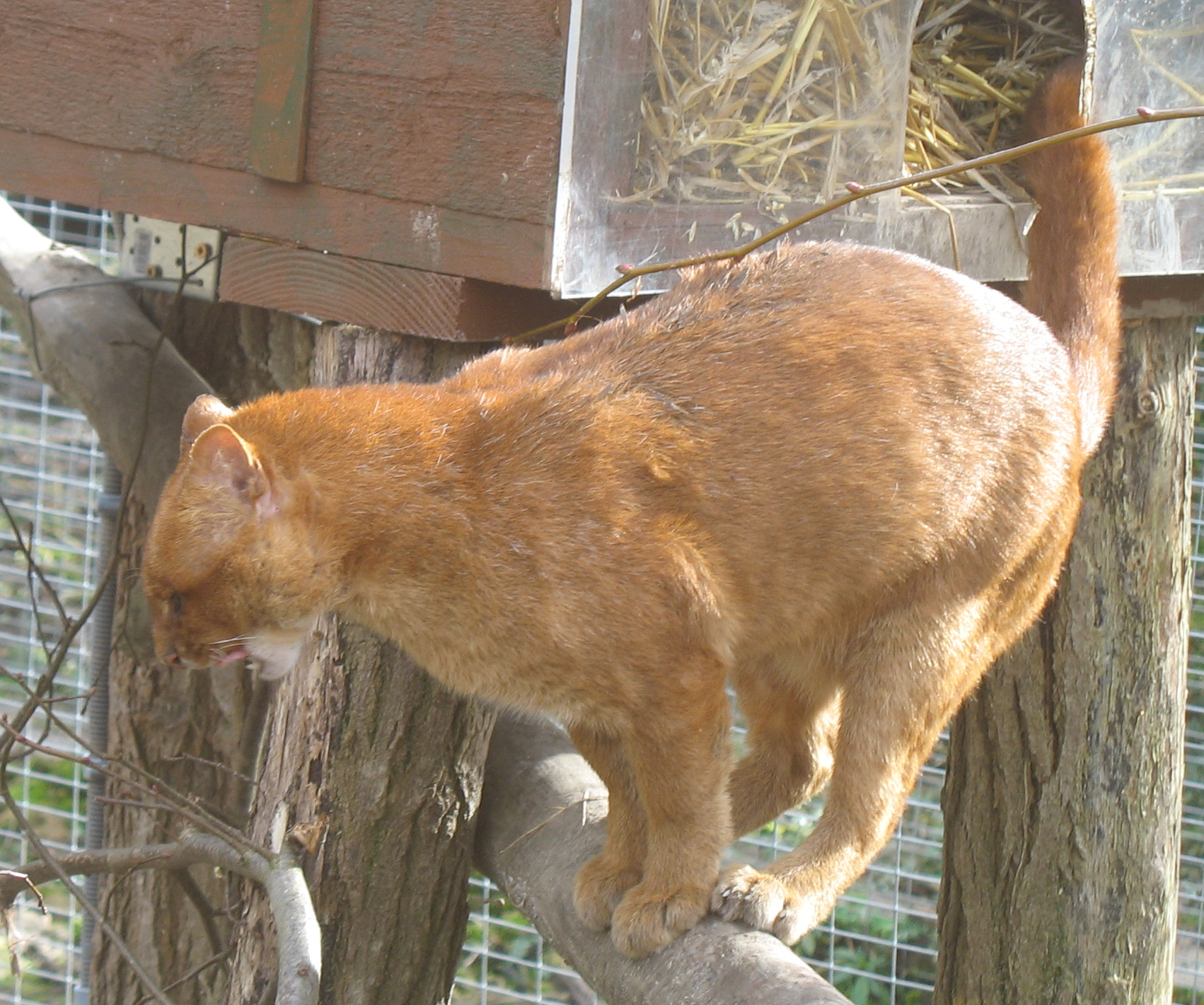
One of three jaguarundi

The American circuit starts at the end of the Katanga lion enclosure. The first habitat of this circuit holds ocelots, and next to it is the jaguar enclosure.

The path continues past enclosures housing margays, Geoffroy's cats, oncillas and pumas. Finally, one arrives at a dead end, to admire the jaguarundis, which are very rare in European zoos.

The path ends with the enclosures of the bobcats and jaguars.

=== Asian circuit ===
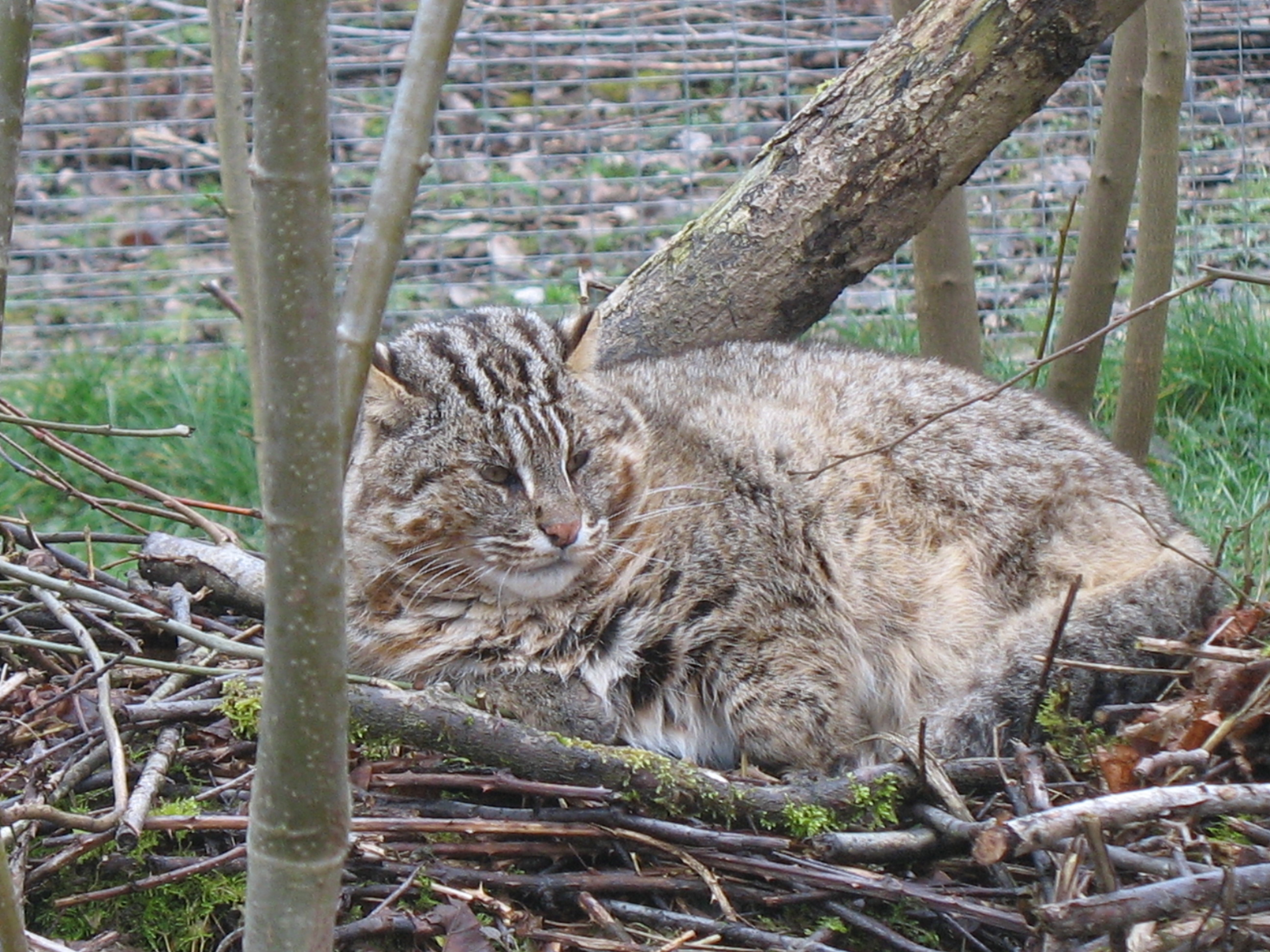
A leopard cat (P. b. euptailurus) from eastern Siberia

The Asian circuit starts at the other end of the Katanga lion enclosure. The first felines on this path are Sumatran tigers, followed by rusty-spotted cats. Further on are the rare Sri Lanka leopards, Asian golden cats, Asian leopard cats, jungle cats and fishing cats.

The path continues with large enclosures containing tigers (particularly Siberian tigers), Amur leopards and Eurasian lynxes. The path ends with eastern Siberian and Mongolian leopard cats, clouded leopards, snow leopards and Pallas's cats.

=== Lemurs ===
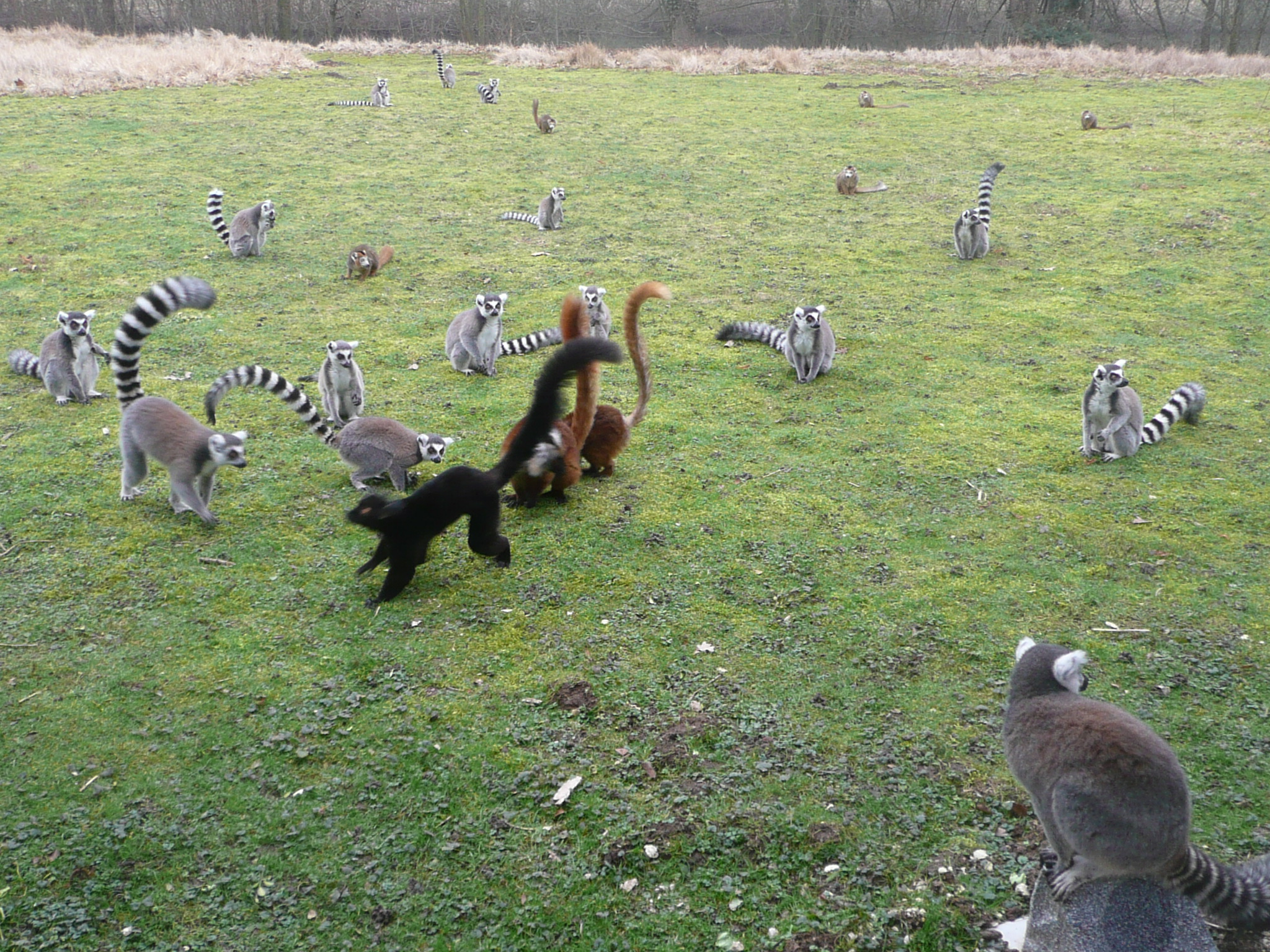
Lemurs gathered in the park

In addition to the felids, there is a large lemur population in the park. Many lemur species are represented, including ring-tailed lemurs, red ruffed lemurs, crowned lemurs, and red-bellied lemurs. Many of the lemurs roam freely about the park, and occasionally interact with visitors.

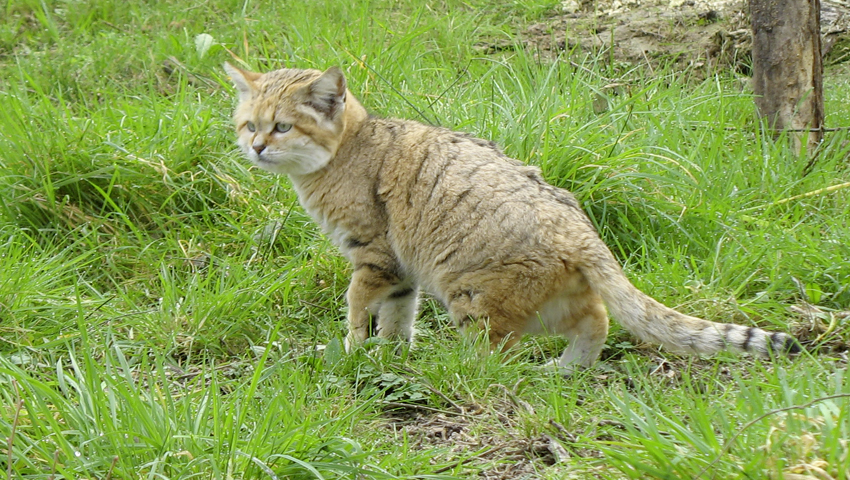
A sand cat at the park
