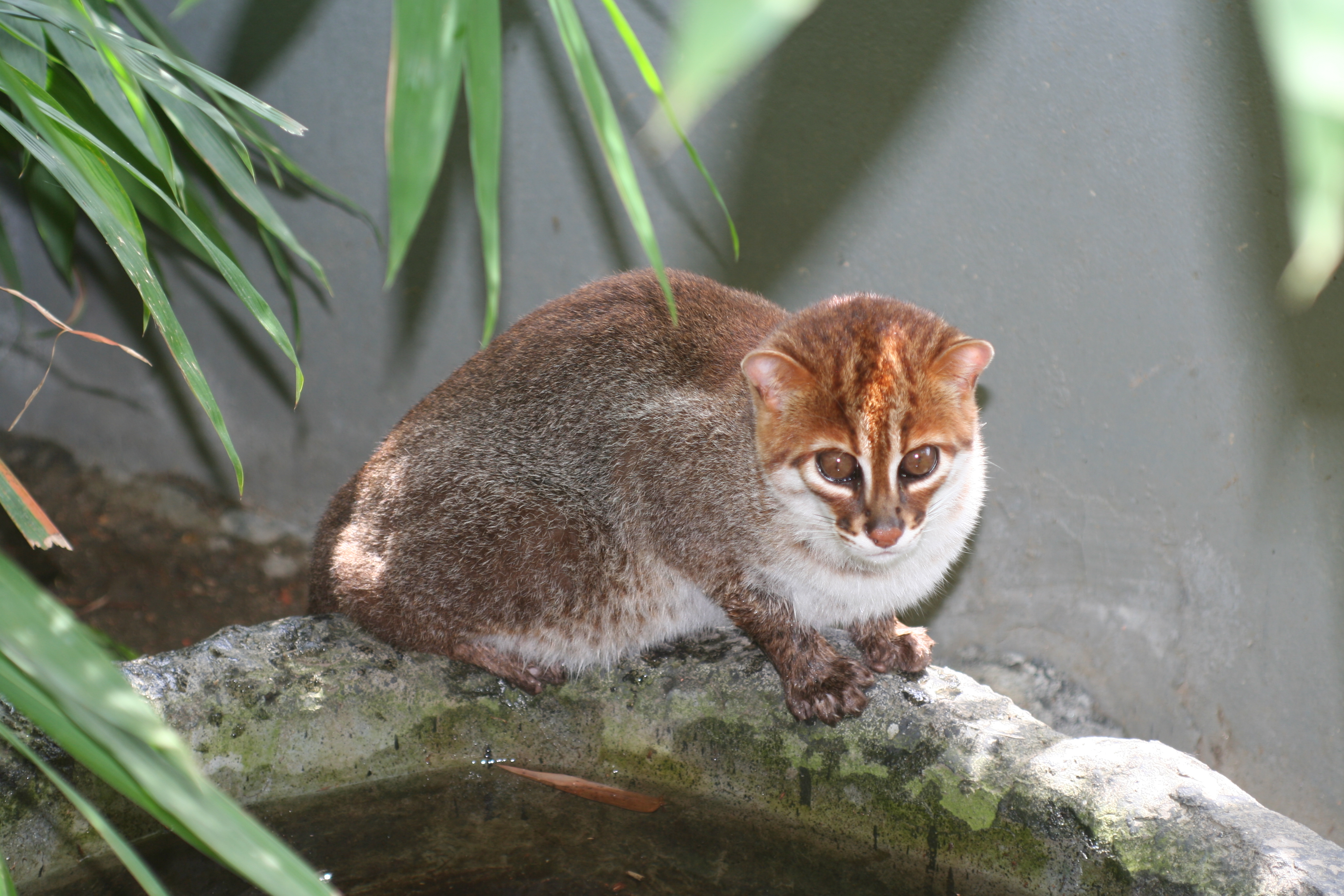

Conservation status
- Endangered (IUCN 3.1)
- CITES Appendix I

Scientific classification
- Kingdom: Animalia
- Phylum: Chordata
- Class: Mammalia
- Infraclass: Placentalia
- Order: Carnivora
- Family: Felidae
- Genus: Prionailurus
- Species: P. planiceps

Binomial name
- Prionailurus planiceps (Vigors & Horsfield, 1827)
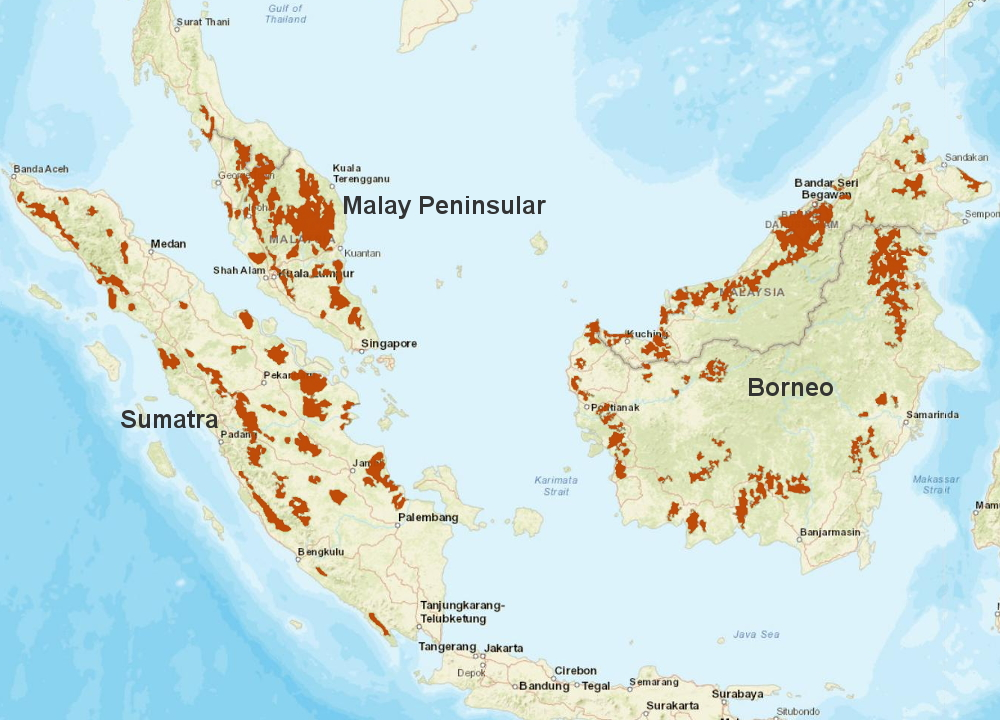
- Distribution of the flat-headed cat, 2015

= Flat-headed cat =

Small wild cat

The flat-headed cat (Prionailurus planiceps) is a small wild cat with short reddish-brown fur. Its head is elongated, and its ears are rounded. Its slender body is 41 to 50 cm (16 to 20 in) long with a tail of 13 to 15 cm (5.1 to 5.9 in), and it weighs 1.5 to 2.5 kg (3.3 to 5.5 lb).

The flat-headed cat was first described in 1827 based on a zoological specimen collected in Sumatra. It is also native to the Thai-Malay Peninsula and Borneo, and inhabits wetlands like mixed freshwater swamp forests, peat swamp forests and lowland freshwater swamps near rivers and coastal areas. It preys foremost on fish, frogs and crustaceans.

The flat-headed cat is threatened by habitat destruction due to conversion for settlements, agriculture and oil palm plantations. It has been listed on the IUCN Red List as Endangered since 2008.

== Taxonomy ==
The scientific name Felis planiceps was proposed by Nicholas Aylward Vigors and Thomas Horsfield in 1827, who first described a skin of a flat-headed cat specimen collected in Sumatra. Prionailurus was proposed by Nikolai Severtzov in 1858 as generic name for spotted wild cats native to Asia. He proposed the generic name Ictailurus for the flat-headed cat.

In 1951, Ellerman and Morrison-Scott grouped the flat-headed cat with the fishing cat (P. viverrinus), assuming it occurs in Lower Siam, Patani, the Malay States, Sumatra and Borneo. It was subordinated to the genus Prionailurus by Ingrid Weigel in 1961 who compared fur patterns of wild and domestic cats. It was grouped into Ictailurus in 1997 following a study on mitochondrial genes of cat species. Today, it is still considered to be a Prionailurus species.

=== Phylogeny ===
Phylogenetic analysis of the nuclear DNA in tissue samples from all Felidae species revealed that their evolutionary radiation began in Asia in the Miocene around 14.45 to 8.38 million years ago. Analysis of mitochondrial DNA of Felidae species indicates a radiation at around 16.76 to 6.46 million years ago. Both models agree in the rusty-spotted cat (P. rubiginosus) having been the first cat of the Prionailurus lineage that genetically diverged, followed by the flat-headed cat and then the fishing cat. It is estimated to have diverged together with the leopard cat (P. bengalensis) between 4.31 to 1.74 million years ago and 4.25 to 0.02 million years ago.

The following cladogram shows their phylogenetic relationship as derived through analysis of nuclear DNA:

- Felidae
  - Felinae
    - - - Prionailurus
          - - - - Leopard cat
                - Fishing Cat
              - Flat-headed cat
            - Rusty-spotted cat
        - Otocolobus
          Pallas's cat (O. manul)
    - other Felinae lineages
  - Pantherinae

== Characteristics ==
The flat-headed cat is reddish-brown on top of the head, dark roan brown on the body with a mottled white underbelly. Its face is lighter in colour than the body, and its muzzle and chin are white. Two prominent buff whitish streaks run on either side of the nose between the eyes. It has rounded ears, and its eyes are set close together, giving it improved stereoscopic vision. The teeth together with well-muscled jaws facilitate catching and retaining slippery prey. The legs are fairly short, and the sheaths of its retractile claws are reduced in size so that about two-thirds are protruding. The depressed skull extends along the nose to the extremity of the muzzle, the sides of which are laterally distended. The head itself is lengthened and cylindrical, and the teeth are unusually long. The body is slender, and the extremities are delicate and lengthened. The anterior upper premolars are larger and sharper relative to other cats. The interdigital webs on its paws help the cat gain better traction in muddy environments and water.

It has a head-and-body length of 41 to 50 cm (16 to 20 in) and a short tail of 13 to 15 cm (5.1 to 5.9 in). It weighs 1.5 to 2.5 kg (3.3 to 5.5 lb).

== Distribution and habitat ==
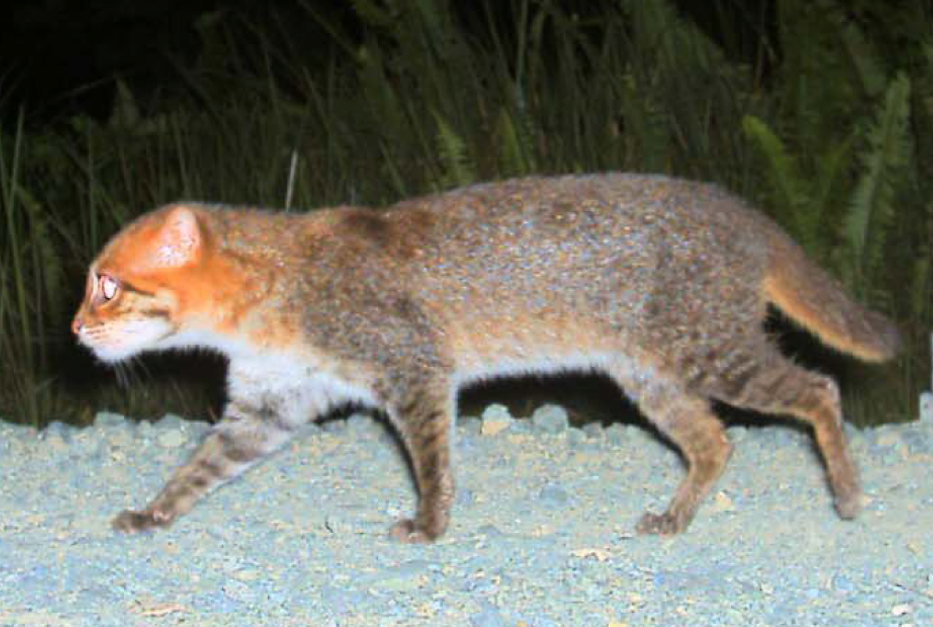
A flat-headed cat seen by a camera trap in Tangkulap Forest Reserve, Sabah, Malaysia in March 2009

The flat-headed cat's distribution is restricted to lowland tropical rainforests in extreme southern Thailand, Peninsular Malaysia, Sumatra and Borneo. It primarily inhabits freshwater habitats near coastal and lowland areas. More than 70% of records were collected less than 3 km (1.9 mi) away from water.

In peninsular Malaysia, flat-headed cats were recorded in Pasoh Forest Reserve in 2013 less than 1.5 km (0.93 mi) away from oil palm plantations. This detection suggests that the flat-headed cat is more tolerant of changes in its surrounding environment than previously assumed. As Pasoh Forest Reserve contains no major rivers or lakes and is generally covered by hill dipterocarp forest, this detection provides new evidence of the flat-headed cat's potential habitat range. The reserve ranks as low probability of occurrence in a previously published species distribution model.

In Sumatra, flat-headed cats were recorded by camera traps on the Kampar Peninsula for the first time in 2015; until 2019, a total of 11 records were obtained in this peat swamp forest at an elevation of 1–7 m (3 ft 3 in – 23 ft 0 in), and at most 1.2 km (0.75 mi) away from a river or canal.

In Kalimantan, flat-headed cats were recorded in mixed swamp forest and tall interior forest at elevations below 20 m (66 ft) in the vicinity of Sabangau National Park. In Sarawak, a flat-headed cat was sighted and photographed on the bank of Maludam River in Maludam National Park in 2013. In Ulu Sebuyau National Park, flat-headed cats were recorded less than 80 m (260 ft) away from Sarawak River.

In Thailand, the flat-headed cat was thought to be extinct, because it had not been seen since 1995, until it was recorded multiple times in 2024 and 2025 during a camera trap survey in Princess Sirindhorn Wildlife Sanctuary in the far south of the country.

== Ecology and behavior ==
A flat-headed cat at night

It is difficult to study the cat, which lives in thick vegetation in wet areas. Camera-trap photos are rare. Flat-headed cats recorded in Kalimantan were foremost active by night. They are presumably solitary, and probably maintain their home ranges by scent marking. In captivity, both females and males spray urine by walking forward in a crouching position, leaving a trail on the ground. Anecdotal historical accounts report that they are nocturnal, but an adult captive female was crepuscular and most active between 8:00 and 11:30 and between 18:00 and 22:00 hours.

The stomach contents of an adult shot on a Malaysian riverbank consisted only of fish. They have been observed to wash objects, raccoon-style. Live fish are readily taken, with full submergence of the head, and the fish were usually carried at least 2 m (6 ft 7 in) away, suggesting a feeding strategy to avoid letting aquatic prey escape back into water. Captive specimens show much greater interest in potential prey in the water than on dry land, suggesting a strong preference for riverine hunting in their natural habitat. Their morphological specializations suggest that their diet is mostly composed of fish, but they are reported to hunt for frogs, and are thought to catch crustaceans. They also catch rats and chickens.

Vocalizations of a flat-headed cat kitten resembled those of a domestic cat. The vocal repertoire of adults has not been analyzed completely, but they purr and give other short-ranged vocalizations.

Their gestation period lasts about 56 days. Of three litters recorded in captivity, one consisted of two kittens; the other two were singletons. Two captive individuals have lived for 14 years.

== Threats ==
The flat-headed cat is foremost threatened by destruction of wetlands and lowland forests, and environmental degradation. This habitat destruction is caused by conversion of natural habitats for settlements, plantations, agriculture and aquaculture, and clearing of mangroves. Overfishing in wetlands and expansion of oil palm plantations are considered to be significant threats. Incidental trapping is also a threat, as some flat-headed cats are reported to have been caught in traps set to protect domestic fowl. Collision with cars and competition with domestic cats could pose serious threats as well.

== Conservation ==
The flat-headed cat is included on CITES Appendix I. It is fully protected by national legislations in all range countries, with hunting and trade prohibited in Thailand, Malaysia and Indonesia.

=== In captivity ===
Songkhla Zoo kept three flat-headed cats as of 2017, which were all born in this zoo in 2009 by captive parents.

== See also ==
- Sunda Islands
