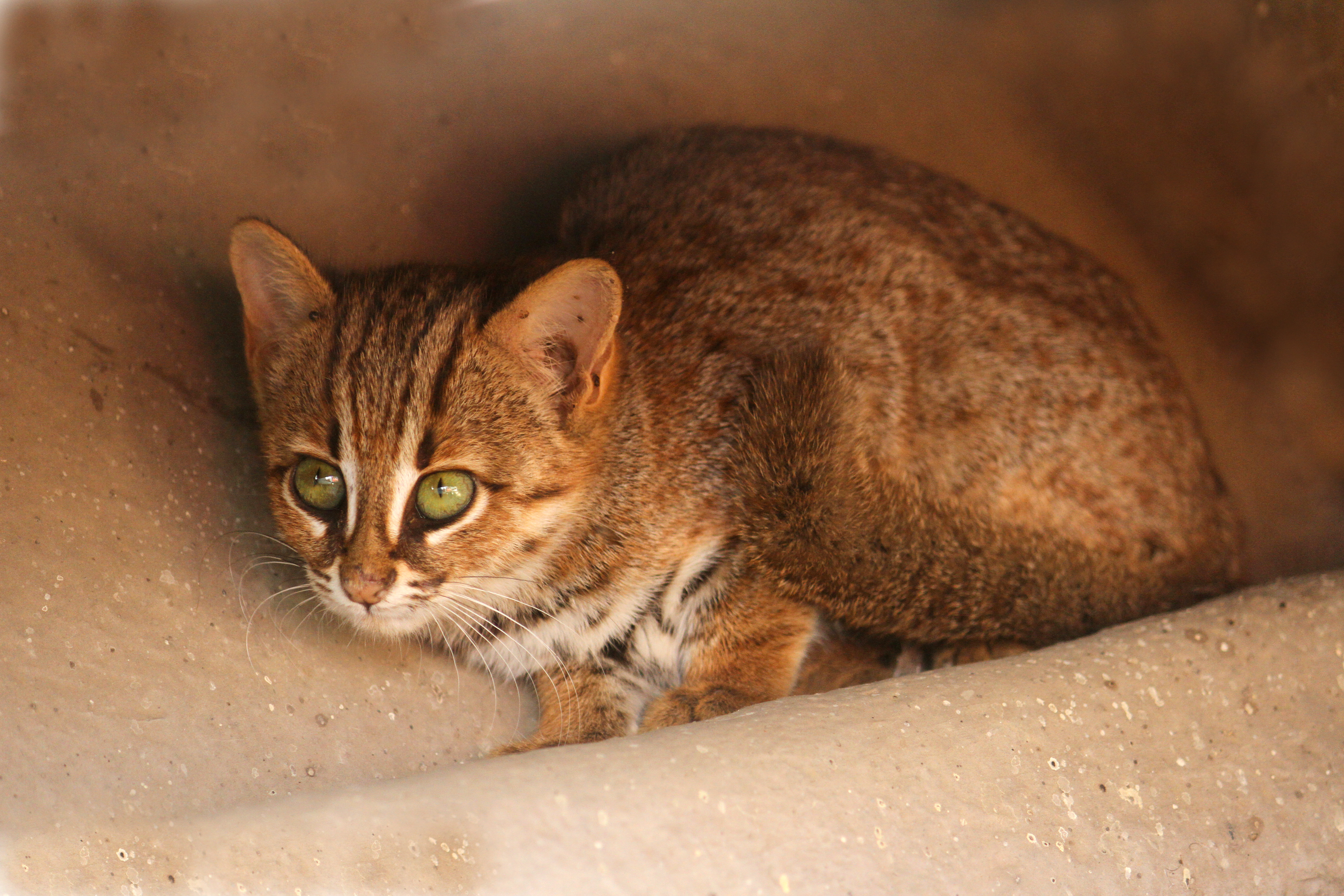

Conservation status
- Near Threatened (IUCN 3.1)
- CITES Appendix I

Scientific classification
- Kingdom: Animalia
- Phylum: Chordata
- Class: Mammalia
- Infraclass: Placentalia
- Order: Carnivora
- Family: Felidae
- Genus: Prionailurus
- Species: P. rubiginosus

Binomial name
- Prionailurus rubiginosus (Geoffroy Saint-Hilaire, 1834)
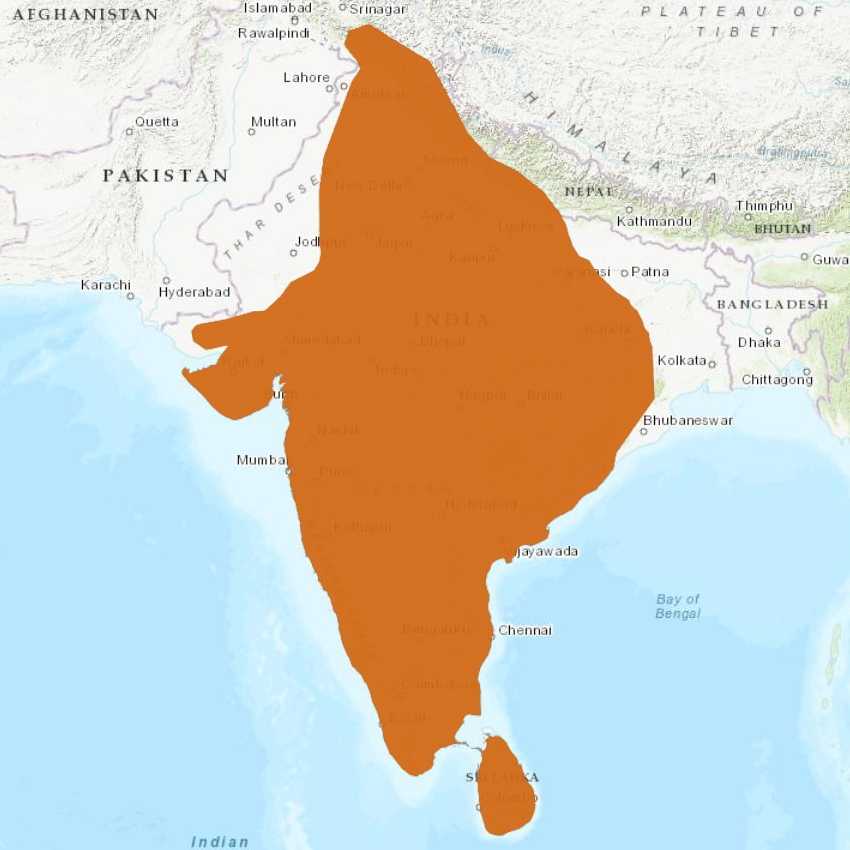
- range of the rusty-spotted cat in 2016

= Rusty-spotted cat =

Small wild cat species native to South Asia

The rusty-spotted cat (Prionailurus rubiginosus) is one of the cat family's smallest members. It is native to India, Nepal and Sri Lanka. Since 2016, it has been listed as Near Threatened on the IUCN Red List as the global population is affected by loss and destruction of its prime habitat, deciduous forests.

== Taxonomy ==
Felis rubiginosa was the scientific name used by Isidore Geoffroy Saint-Hilaire in 1831 for a rusty-spotted cat specimen from Pondicherry, India. Prionailurus was proposed by Nikolai Severtzov in 1858 as a generic name. Prionailurus rubiginosus phillipsi was proposed by Reginald Innes Pocock in 1939 who described a specimen from the Central Province, Sri Lanka and subordinated both to the genus Prionailurus.

=== Phylogeny ===
Phylogenetic analysis of the nuclear DNA in tissue samples from all Felidae species revealed that the evolutionary radiation of the Felidae began in Asia in the Miocene around 14.45 to 8.38 million years ago. Analysis of mitochondrial DNA of all Felidae species indicates a radiation at around 16.76 to 6.46 million years ago.

The Prionailurus species are estimated to have had a common ancestor between 8.16 to 4.53 million years ago, and 8.76 to 0.73 million years ago. The rusty-spotted cat possibly genetically diverged from this ancestor between 6.54 to 3.42 million years ago. Both models agree in the rusty-spotted cat having been the first cat of this lineage that diverged, followed by the flat-headed cat (P. planiceps) and the fishing cat (P. viverrinus). The following cladogram shows the phylogenetic relationships of the rusty-spotted cat as derived through analysis of nuclear DNA:

- Felidae
  - Felinae
    - - - Prionailurus
          - - - - Leopard cat
                - Fishing Cat
              - Flat-headed cat
            - Rusty-spotted cat
        - Otocolobus
          Pallas's cat (O. manul)
    - other Felinae lineages
  - Pantherinae

== Characteristics ==
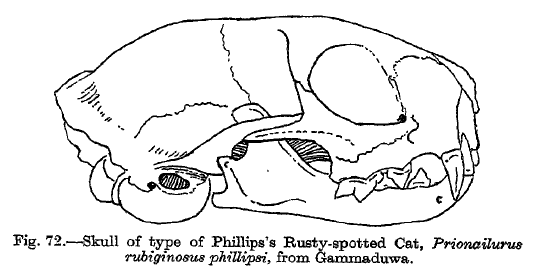
Illustration of a skull

The rusty-spotted cat has short reddish grey fur over most of the body with rusty spots on the back and flanks. Four blackish lines run over the eyes, and two of them extend over the neck. Six dark streaks are on each side of the head, extending over the cheeks and forehead. Its chin, throat, inner side of the limbs and belly are whitish with tiny brownish spots. It has a rusty band on the chest. Its paws and tail are uniform reddish grey.

It is the smallest wild cat in Asia and rivals the black-footed cat as the world's smallest wild cat. It is 35 to 48 cm (14 to 19 in) in length, with a 15 to 30 cm (5.9 to 11.8 in) tail, and weighs 0.9 to 1.6 kg (2.0 to 3.5 lb). The bushy tail is about half the length of the body.

== Distribution and habitat ==
The distribution of the rusty-spotted cat is relatively restricted. It occurs mainly in moist and dry deciduous forests as well as scrub and grassland, but is likely absent in evergreen forest. It prefers dense vegetation and rocky areas.

In India, it was long thought to be confined to the south, but records have established that it occurs over much of the country. It was observed in eastern Gujarat's Gir National Park, in Maharashtra's Tadoba-Andhari Tiger Reserve and along India's Eastern Ghats. Camera trapping revealed its presence in Pilibhit Tiger Reserve in the Indian Terai and in Nagzira Wildlife Sanctuary in Maharashtra. In western Maharashtra, the rusty-spotted cat is breeding in a human dominated agricultural landscape, where rodent densities are high. In December 2014 and in April 2015, it was photographed by camera traps in the Kalesar National Park of Haryana. It was also recorded by camera traps in Mirzapur Forest Division of Uttar Pradesh in 2018.

In March 2012, a rusty-spotted cat was photographed in Bardia National Park for the first time, and in March 2016 also in Shuklaphanta National Park, both in Nepal.

In Sri Lanka, there are a few records in montane and lowland rainforest. There are two distinct populations, one in the dry zone and the other in the wet zone. In 2016, it was recorded for the first time in Horton Plains National Park at elevations of 2,084–2,162 m (6,837–7,093 ft).

== Ecology and behaviour ==
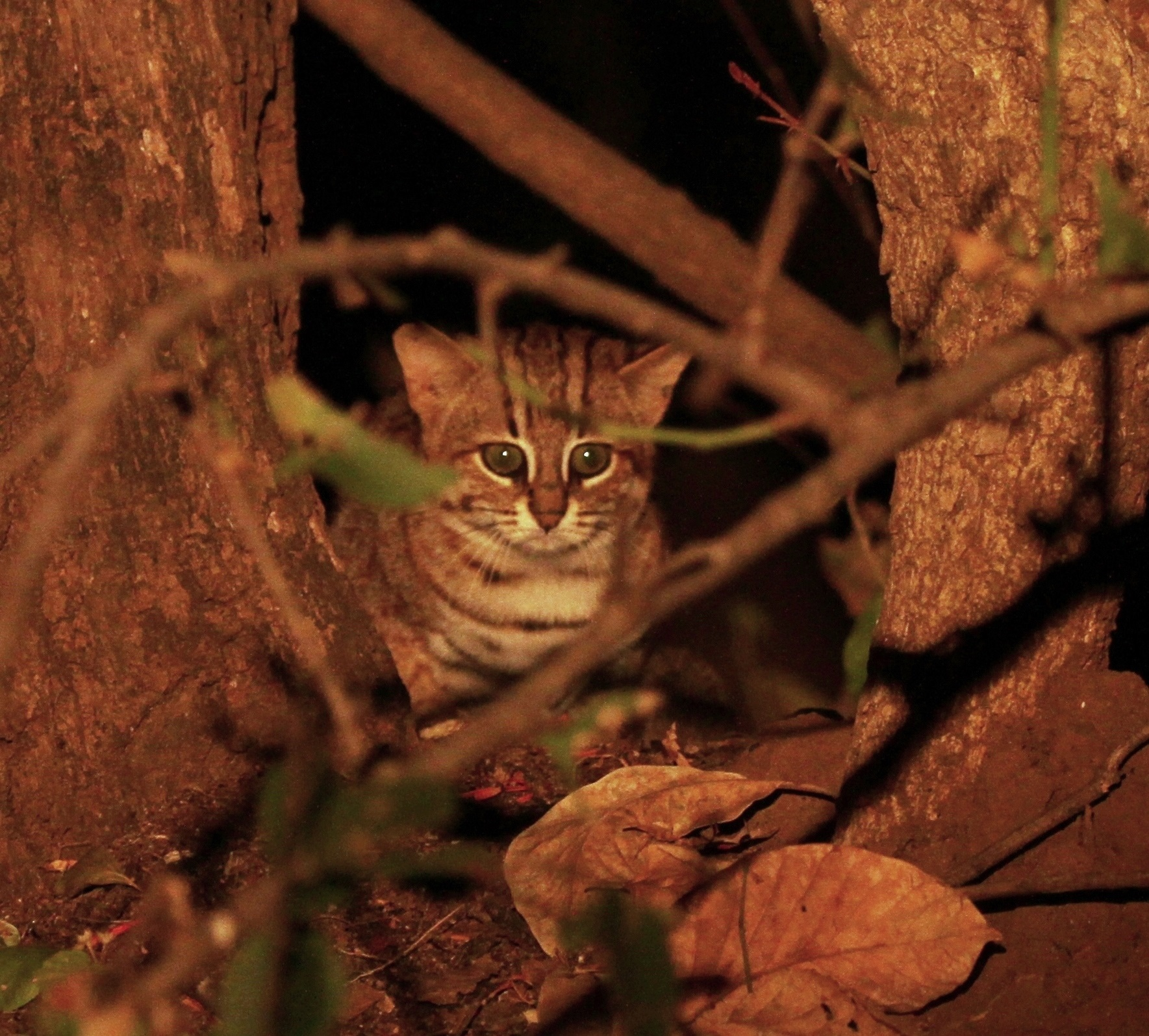
Rusty-spotted cat in its natural habitat

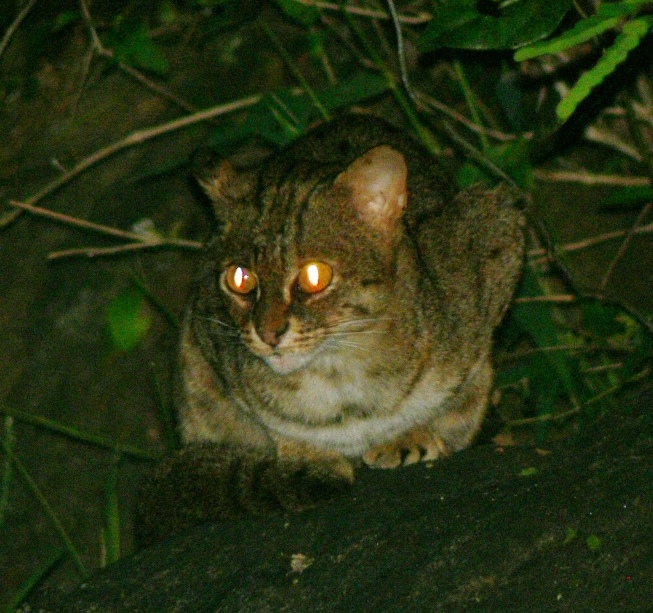
Rusty-spotted cat photographed in the Anaimalai Hills

Very little is known about the ecology and behaviour of the rusty-spotted cat in the wild. Captive ones are mostly nocturnal but also briefly active during the day. Most wild ones were also recorded after dark. At Horton Plain National Park in Sri Lanka, they were mostly recorded between sunset and sunrise, with limited daytime activity. Several individuals were observed hiding in trees and in caves.

It feeds mainly on rodents and birds, but also preys on lizards, frogs, and insects. It hunts primarily on the ground, making rapid, darting movements to catch its prey. It apparently ventures into trees to escape larger predators. Captive females and males both scent-mark their home range by spraying urine.

=== Reproduction ===
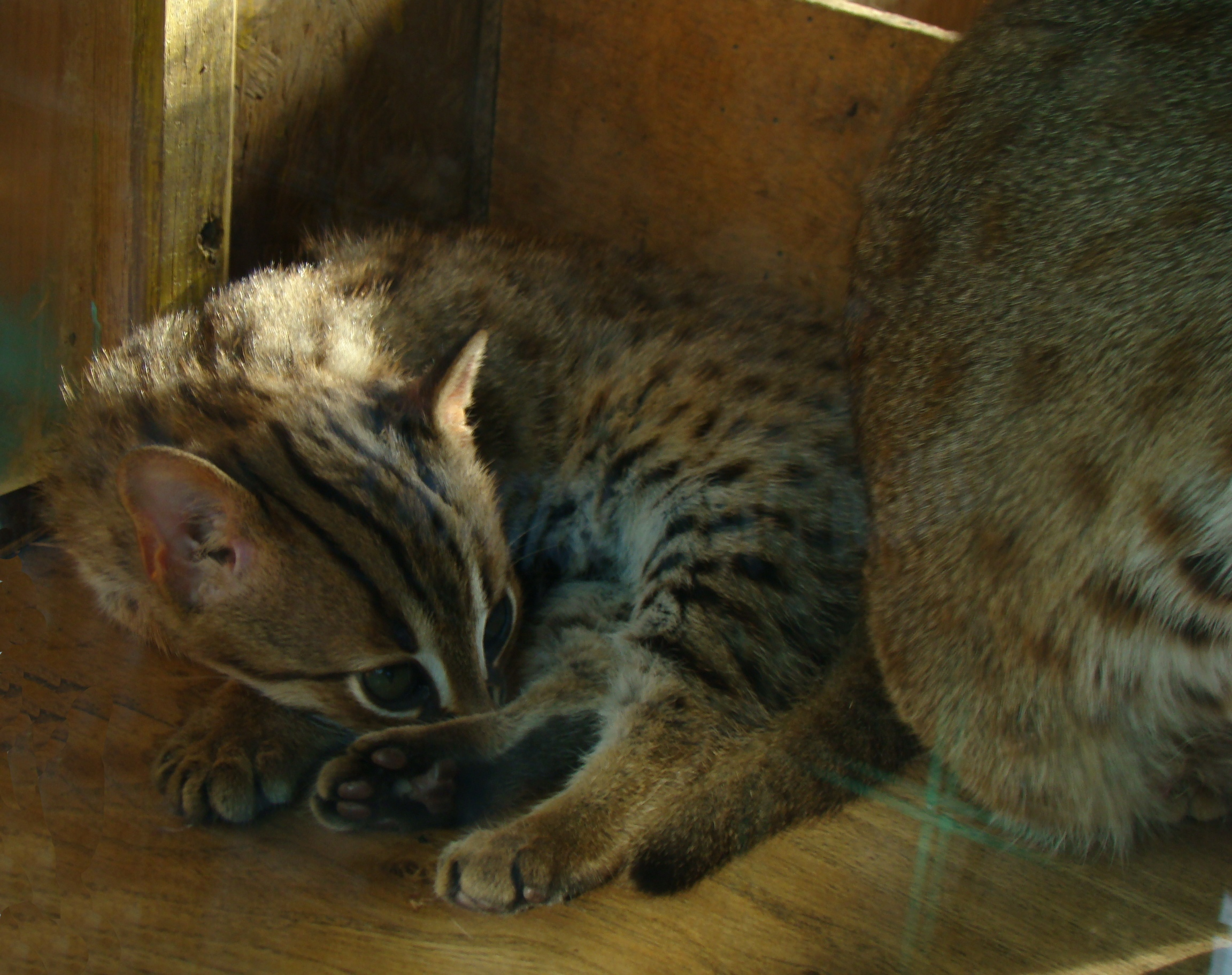
A rusty-spotted cat kitten at the Parc des Félins, France

The female's oestrus lasts five days, and mating is unusually brief. Since the female is likely to be vulnerable during this period, its brevity may be an adaptation to help it avoid larger predators. She prepares a den in a secluded location, and after a gestation of 65–70 days gives birth to one or two kittens. At birth, the kittens weigh just 60 to 77 g (2.1 to 2.7 oz), and are marked with rows of black spots. They reach sexual maturity at around 68 weeks, by which time they have developed the distinctive adult coat pattern of rusty blotches. Rusty-spotted cats have lived for twelve years in captivity; their lifespan in the wild is unknown.

== Threats ==
Habitat loss and the spread of cultivation are serious problems for wildlife in both India and Sri Lanka. Although there are several records of the rusty-spotted cat in cultivated and settled areas, it is not known to what degree these populations are able to persist in such areas. There have been occasional reports of rusty-spotted cat skins in trade. In some areas, it is hunted for food or as a livestock pest.

== Conservation ==
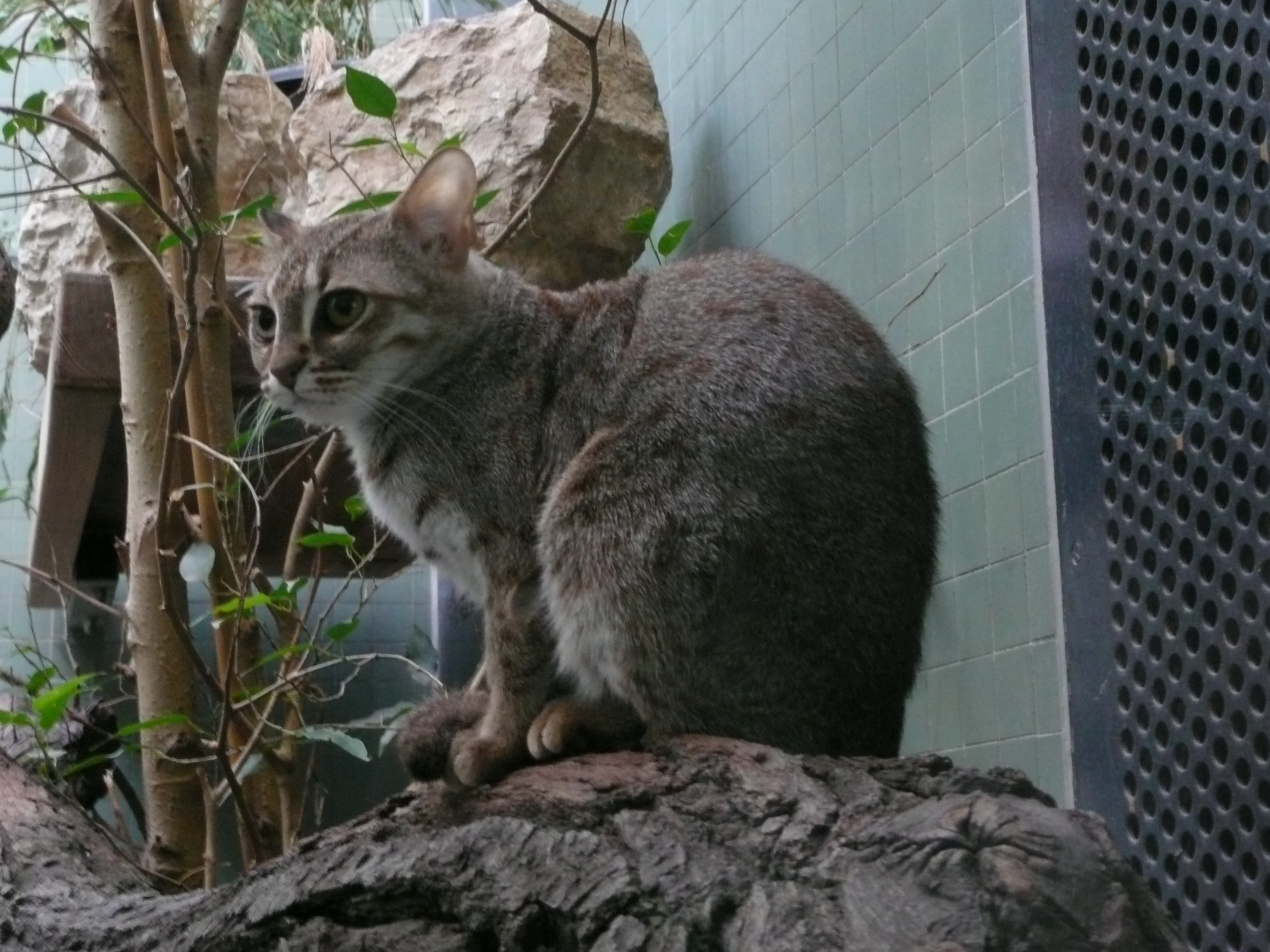
Rusty-spotted cat in Berlin Zoo, 2008

The Indian population is listed on CITES Appendix I. The Sri Lankan population is included on CITES Appendix II. The species is fully protected over most of its range, with hunting and trade banned in India and Sri Lanka.

As of 2010, the captive population of P. r. phillipsi comprised 56 individuals in eight institutions, of which 11 individuals were kept in the Colombo Zoo in Sri Lanka and 45 individuals in seven European zoos.
