= SLiM =

Genetic simulation software

SLiM ("Selection on Linked Mutations") is software designed for conducting forward-in-time genetic simulations of eco-evolutionary scenarios. It allows researchers to simulate complex population genetics models, accommodating both Wright-Fisher and non-Wright-Fisher models. Over a thousand scientific papers have cited one of the SLiM release publications (and, presumably, used the software for simulations), according to GoogleScholar (in particular version 3).

SLiM supports various evolutionary processes, including mutation, recombination, migration, and genetic drift, selection on fecundity or survival, and is designed to enable users to explore the dynamics of genomes under different selective pressures and demographic events of one or multiple populations and species.

The SLiM also offers a scripting language, Eidos, which provides customization options for defining evolutionary parameters and interactions within and between populations. Almost all information regarding Eidos and SLiM are available in the SLiM and Eidos manuals.
