= Lineage (genetic) =

All descendants of a given genetic sequence

A genetic lineage includes all descendants of a given genetic sequence, typically following a new mutation. It is not the same as an allele because it excludes cases where different mutations give rise to the same allele, and includes descendants that differ from the ancestor by one or more mutations. The genetic sequence can be of different sizes, e.g. a single gene or a haplotype containing multiple adjacent genes along a chromosome. Given recombination, each gene can have a separate genetic lineages, even as the population shares a single organismal lineage. In asexual microbes or somatic cells, cell lineages exactly match genetic lineages, and can be traced.

== Incomplete lineage sorting ==
Figure 1. Incomplete lineage sorting. The gene G has two versions (alleles), G0 and G1. The ancestor of A, B and C originally had only one version of gene G, G0. At some point, a mutation occurred and the ancestral population became polymorphic, with some individuals having G0 and others G1. When species A split off, it retained only G1, while the ancestor of B and C remained polymorphic. When B and C diverged, B retained only G1 and C only G0; neither were now polymorphic in G. The tree for gene G shows A and B as sisters, whereas the species tree shows B and C as sisters.

Incomplete lineage sorting describes when the phylogenetic tree for a gene does not match that of the species. For example, while most human gene lineages coalesce first with chimpanzee lineages, and then with gorilla lineages, other configurations also occur.

== Lineage selection ==
Lineage selection occurs when the frequency of members of one lineage changes relative to another lineage. It is useful for studying alleles with complex effects that play out over multiple generations, e.g. alleles that affect recombination, evolvability, or altruism. Lineage selection is also useful in determining the effects of mutations in highly structured environments such as tumors.

Long-term stochastic outcomes of competition among lineages can be quantified within mathematical models as the ratio of fixation probability : counterfixation probability. Inclusive fitness is equal to the average organismal fitness of individuals across the probability distribution of possible lineages.

== Tree sequence recording ==
Tree sequence recording describes efficient methods to record surviving lineages while conducting computer simulations of population genetics. Resulting 'forward time' computer simulations offer an alternative to 'backward time' coalescent theory. Tree sequence recording has been incorporated into the population simulation software SLiM.

== Sexual lineages compared to asexual lineages ==
Sexual reproduction is the most common form of reproduction in the genetic lineages of multicellular organisms, and a complete lack of sexual reproduction is relatively rare among such organisms, particularly animals. Sexual reproduction appears to have emerged very early in the evolution of eukaryotes implying that the essential features of meiosis were already present in the earliest eukaryotic genetic lineage.

Among eukaryotes, almost all lineages with asexual modes of reproduction maintain meiosis either in a modified form or as an alternative pathway. A constraint on a meiotic sexual lineage undergoing switching to an ameiotic, asexual form of reproduction appears to be the concomitant loss of the protective recombinational repair of DNA damage that is a key function of meiosis.
