= Tigercat (disambiguation) =

Tigercat is the Grumman F7F Tigercat, an American heavy fighter aircraft.

Tigercat or tiger cat may also refer to:

- Tigercat (sailboat), a 1960s catamaran sailboat
- Hamilton Tiger-Cats, a Canadian football team
- Tigercat missile, a mobile land-based version of the Sea Cat
- "Tiger Cat" (Tom and Jerry Tales), an episode of the cartoon series Tom and Jerry Tales

== Animals ==
- One of several small felines in the genus Leopardus:
  - Clouded tiger cat, a small spotted cat found in Central and South America
  - Leopardus guttulus or southern tiger cat, a small wild cat native to some South American countries
  - Margay, a small wild cat native to Mexico, Central and South America
  - Oncilla or northern tiger cat, a small spotted cat in Central America and Brazil
  - Tilcayo or tilcayo tiger cat, a small wild cat native to Bolivia
- Tiger quoll, also known as the "tiger cat", an Australian marsupial
- Telescopus semiannulatus, also known as the "tiger cat snake", a rear-fanged colubrid snake found in Africa

== See also ==
- Tiger catshark, a species of catshark
