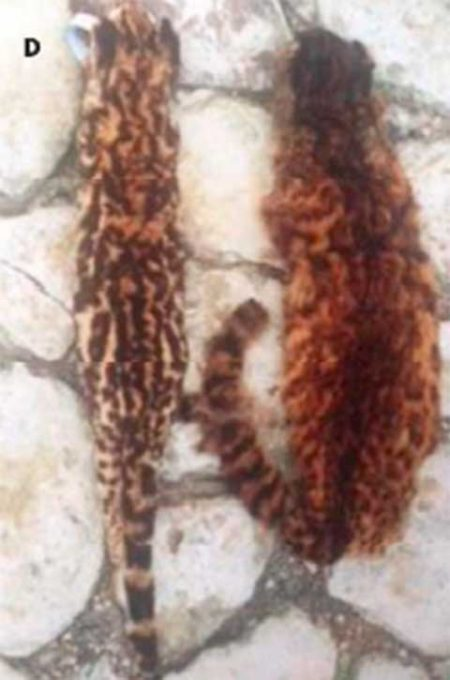
- The holotype specimen (right) beside a tigrina specimen (left)

Scientific classification
- Kingdom: Animalia
- Phylum: Chordata
- Class: Mammalia
- Order: Carnivora
- Family: Felidae
- Genus: Leopardus
- Species: L. narinensis

Binomial name
- Leopardus narinensis Ruiz-García et al., 2023

= Leopardus narinensis =

Small wild cat

Leopardus narinensis, also called the red tigrina, Nariño cat, and Galeras cat by the scientists who discovered it, is a putative species of small wild cat in the genus Leopardus. It was described in 2023, based on a single skin collected in 1989.

== Etymology ==
The specific epithet narinensis refers to the Nariño Department in southern Colombia, where the skin was collected. The proposed common names "Nariño cat" and "Galeras cat" also refer to where it was found (the Galeras volcano in the Nariño Department), while "red tigrina" refers to its markedly reddish coloring.

== Taxonomy and phylogeny ==
The skin was first collected in 1989 and donated to a Colombian national institute, which later transferred its biological collections to the Alexander von Humboldt Biological Resources Research Institute, where it remained classified as an ocelot skin until 2001, when Manuel Ruiz-García noticed it while searching for jaguar and puma specimens. He recognized it as being a different species and, when other authorities on South American cats could not identify it, spent the next two decades researching the skin. The final paper was published in June 2023.

The red tigrina is classified as a member of the genus Leopardus, the small spotted cats of South America.

A scientific paper published only two months later, in August 2023, considered the holotype of L. narinensis to be a specimen of L. tigrinus based on morphological comparison.

The describing authors published a second, even more detailed genetic analysis paper in 2025. The name Leopardus narinensis had previously been mentioned in 2018 but was unavailable under the rules of the International Code of Zoological Nomenclature (ICZN) due to the absence of a designated type specimen and formal description; it became available only with the 2023 description. However, a subsequent taxonomic reassessment comparing the type specimen with material of Leopardus pardinoides from Colombian collections concluded that L. narinensis should be regarded as a junior synonym of L. pardinoides

=== Phylogeny ===
Genetic analyses indicate that the Nariño cat diverged from other Leopardus species about 1.3–1.0 million years ago. Both its nuclear and mitochondrial DNA are noted to be different from every known species of cat. In those genetic tests, it was consistently recovered as a sister taxon to the kodkod-Geoffroy's cat clade.

Cladogram of L. narinensis' position in the genus:

- Leopardus
  - Leopardus colocolo
  - - - - Leopardus wiedii
        - Leopardus pardalis
      - Leopardus tigrinus
    - Leopardus jacobita
  - - - Leopardus guigna
      - Leopardus geoffroyi
    - Leopardus narinensis

== Characteristics ==
The Galeras cat is, like other tigrinas, a small spotted cat, but the base color of its fur is more reddish than in other tigrinas. The rosettes are black but with even more intensely red coloring on the inside. The top of the head and the dorsal crest are darker. The body is shorter and more robust, and the head is rounder and wider, the face flatter. The coat is denser and woollier.

== Distribution and habitat ==
The holotype and only specimen was collected from the páramo of the Galeras volcano in southern Colombia, 3,100 metres (10,200 ft) above sea level. The region has a high level of endemism due to isolation during the climatic changes at the end of the Pleistocene.

It has not been recorded by the camera traps that have been present in southern Colombia since 2018, and the species may already be nearly (or even totally) extinct.

== See also ==
- List of living mammal species described in the 2020s
