= Paola Nogales-Ascarrunz =

Bolivian biologist (born 1994)

- Born: Paola Micaela Nogales Ascarrunz; August 5, 1994 (age 32); La Paz, Bolivia
- Education: Higher University of San Andrés; Queen Mary University of London (MS)
- Known for: Tilcayo species identification
- Awards: Chevening Scholarship
- Scientific career
- Workplaces: National Natural History Museum of Bolivia

Paola Micaela Nogales Ascarrunz (Note: In this name that follows Hispanic American naming customs, the first or paternal surname is Nogales and the second or maternal family name is Ascarrunz.) is a Bolivian biologist whose research focuses on the conservation of New World cats. She is a researcher at the National Natural History Museum of Bolivia and a National Geographic Society explorer. Her research contributed to the description of the tilcayo as a distinct species of tiger cat.

She is a member of the Bolivian Network of Mammalogy (Red Boliviana de Mastozoología).

== Early life and education ==
Nogales-Ascarrunz was born on August 5, 1994, in La Paz, Bolivia. She earned a degree in biology from the Higher University of San Andrés in 2019. She received a Chevening Scholarship to study abroad and earned a master's degree in ecological and evolutionary genomics from Queen Mary's College, University of London, in 2022.

== Research ==
Nogales-Ascarrunz's research involves Bolivia's wild cats. She leads the Research Program for Bolivian Felids (Programa de Investigación de Félidos de Bolivia). Her conservation efforts focus on jaguars and Geoffroy's cats, including efforts to mitigate poaching.

In 2024, she documented the existence of Pantanal cats in the Chiquitano dry forests, which were previously not considered part of their habitat.

She was part of a research team that identified the tilcayo as a new species in 2026. The tilcayo was the first extant cat species formally described since 1923. The team also described a new tiger cat subspecies in Peru’s Yungas region, naming it Leopardus tigrinus antisuyo after Antisuyu, the region of the old Inca empire that included the area it inhabits.

== Recognitions and awards ==
On September 21, 2026, Governor of La Paz Luis Revilla held a ceremony in recognition of the achievement of Nogales and Enzo Aliaga Rossel in identifying the tilcayo.
