= Tigrina =

Tigrina may refer to:

- several felines:
  - Leopardus guttulus, the southern tigrina
  - Leopardus tigrinus, the tigrina or oncilla
  - Leopardus narinensis, the red tigrina
- "Tigrina", a pseudonym used by pioneering lesbian publisher Lisa Ben in science fiction fandom
