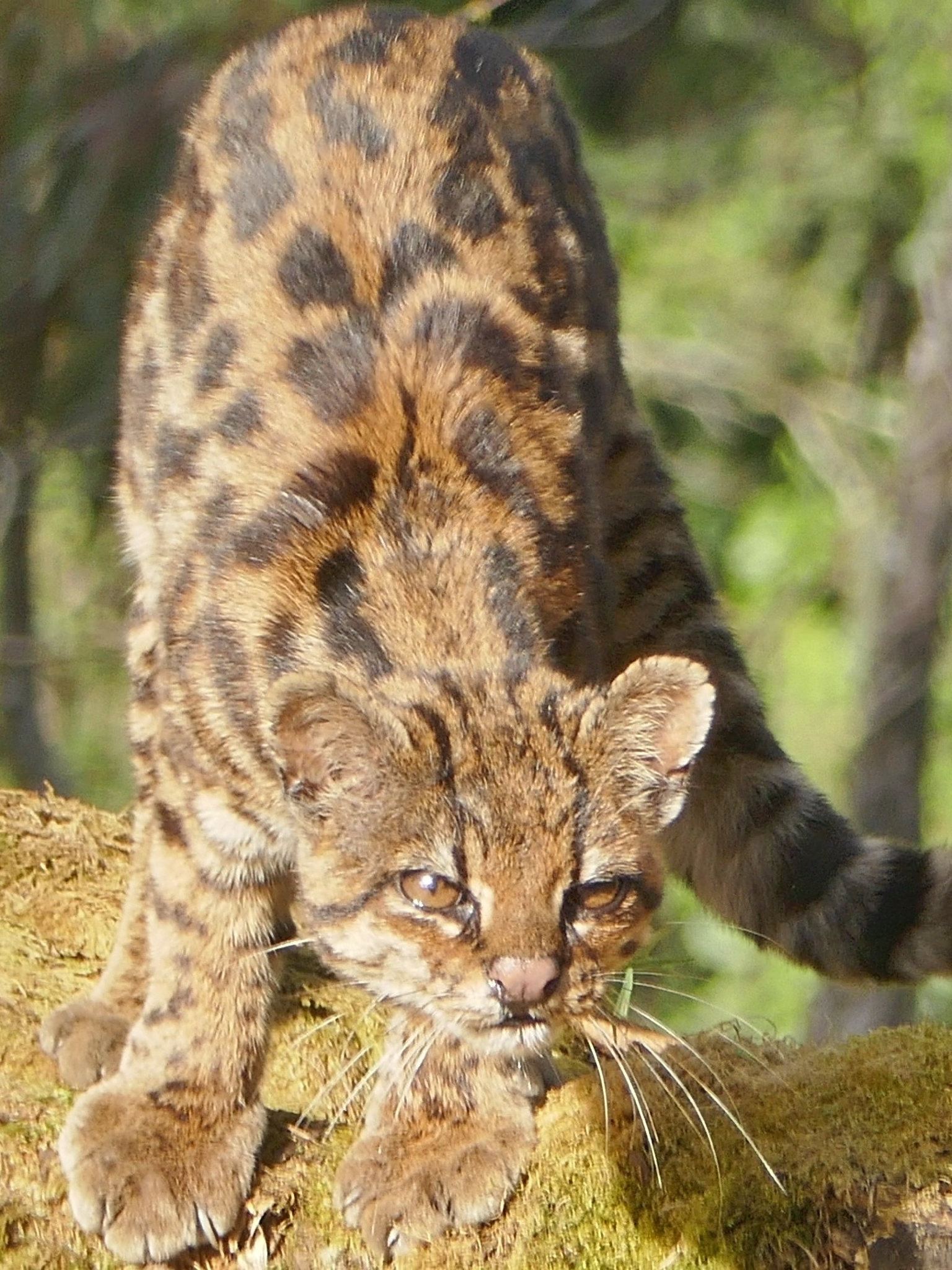

Conservation status
- Vulnerable (IUCN 3.1)
- CITES Appendix I

Scientific classification
- Kingdom: Animalia
- Phylum: Chordata
- Class: Mammalia
- Order: Carnivora
- Family: Felidae
- Genus: Leopardus
- Species: L. pardinoides

Binomial name
- Leopardus pardinoides Gray, 1867

= Clouded tiger cat =

Small wild cat

The clouded tiger cat (Leopardus pardinoides) or clouded oncilla is a small spotted cat found in Central and South America, particularly in Andean montane cloud forests from 1,500 to 3,000 metres (4,900 to 9,800 ft) above sea level. It is one of four proposed tiger cat species, along with the oncilla, or the northern tiger cat (L. tigrinus), the tilcayo (L. tilcayo) and the southern tiger cat (L. guttulus), with arguments put forward to elevate this population to the status of species after the publication of a 2024 study. The species is threatened by climate change and deforestation, and has experienced widespread habitat loss.

== Characteristics ==
Like the oncilla, the clouded tiger cat is similar to the margay (L. wiedii), especially the shape of the head. The species has short, round ears, a long, bushy tail, and a soft fur coat featuring a mixture of red, orange, gray, and yellow fur with irregular "cloudy" or "nebulous" rosettes which will occasionally coalesce into bands, similar to ocelots. Clouded tiger cats belonging to the southernmost segment of their range can feature rounder rosettes. The tail features a pattern of banding with larger black blotches.

The eyes are larger than other tiger cats, but smaller than those of the margay. Also like the margay, females have one pair of teats. The paws are proportionally large for the size of the cat. Clouded tiger cats are unable to rotate their ankle joint, but have been observed climbing upside-down for short distances, unlike northern or southern tiger cats.

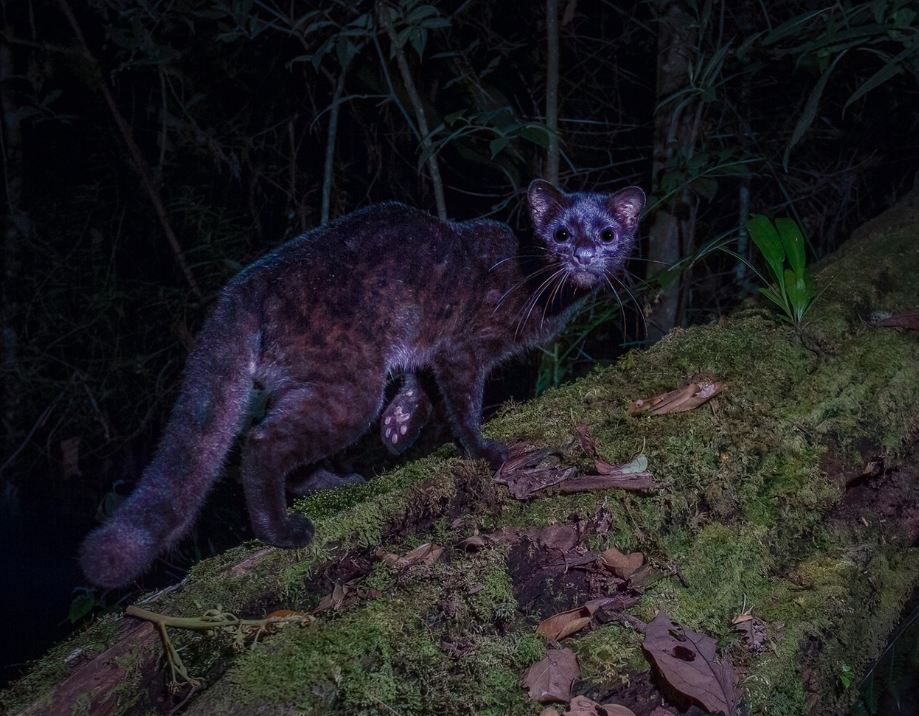
A melanistic clouded tiger cat

Measurements are similar to closely related species L. tigrinus and L. guttulus, and the clouded tiger cat is similarly small, with a head and body length from 41 to 54 centimetres (16 to 21 in), and tail length from 24.5 to 34 centimetres (9.6 to 13.4 in). The weight averages 2.27 kilograms (5.0 lb).

Melanistic specimens account for 6.5% to 32% of recorded sightings, with variations by region; the highest frequency is recorded in Costa Rica at 32%, dropping to 18.4% in Ecuador, and 6.5% in Colombia.

== Distribution and habitat ==
The clouded tiger cat is distributed sparsely from the forests of Costa Rica and Panama, and through the Andes mountains to northwestern Argentina. The species occurs primarily in cloud forests and typically dwells from 1,500 to 3,000 metres (4,900 to 9,800 ft) above sea level. A 2024 analysis compared the historical range of the species to modern data, finding a 50.4% reduction in range from 824,923 to 409,371 square kilometres (318,505 to 158,059 mi^{2}), likely due to climate change and deforestation. Nearly half of the species' reported range is within Colombia.

== Diet and behavior ==
The clouded tiger cat, like similar cats, has a diet consisting mainly of small rodents, reptiles, and ground-dwelling birds. As the species is considered nocturnal and "lunar phobic", (Note: "lunar phobic" refers to a species exhibiting the behavior of avoiding activity during bright moonlight.) it prefers prey which are also active during its most-active period, which is after sunset and before sunrise. A report has suggested that the clouded tiger cat employs temporal segregation in order to avoid conflicts with dogs, weasels, and tayras, as well as other cats.

== Taxonomy ==
Felis pardinoides was originally described in 1867 by John Edward Gray, of a specimen supposedly from India. In 1874, after noting that "the Indian habitat has not been confirmed; and the species has a very South-American aspect" he described a second specimen that had been collected in Bogotá, Colombia as being the same species.

Oldfield Thomas noted in 1903 that the "spotted tiger-cats of Brazil" were "very badly represented in most Museums", and that the literature about them was "in a great state of confusion". He compared new specimens obtained by a Mr A. Robert with the specimens of Hensel held in Berlin. Hensel had described Felis guttula as a new species, which he distinguished from "Felis macroura, Weid" and "F. guigna, Mol.". However, Thomas noted that Hensel's "Felis guigna" specimen should rather be referred to F. pardinoides. Thomas described three subspecies: nominate F. pardinoides ("hab. Espiritu Santo"), F. pardinoides oncilla (Volcan de Irazu, Costa Rica), and F. pardinoides andina (Jima, Province of Azuay, Ecuador).

Gray's Felis pardinoides was later subsumed into a single species of oncilla, as Felis tigrinus or Leopardus tigrinus.

In 2013, proposals were put forward to split the oncilla (Leopardus tigrinus) into two species; the northern tiger cat (L. tigrinus) and the southern tiger cat (L. guttulus). While studying the distribution of these populations, researchers from the Universidade Estadual do Maranhão discovered and argued for the existence of this third species, L. pardinoides.

In 2023, the genomic sequences of the Andean tiger cats were studied, and found to be similar to those of the Central American tiger cats (Talamanca mountains in Costa Rica, formerly classified as L. t. oncilla). Although the two populations are isolated, the authors concluded they are sufficiently alike to be considered a single species.

== Threats ==
Both closely related southern and northern tiger cats are listed as vulnerable on the IUCN Red List, which currently includes the clouded tiger cat under L. tigrinus. The species' primary habitat, cloud forests, are threatened by climate change and deforestation. They are also threatened by poaching, as well as predation by and diseases from dogs.
