= La Senda Verde =

Bolivian wildlife refuge

- Founded: 2003
- Founder: Vicky Ossio; Marcelo Levy
- Type: Non-governmental organization
- Location: Coroico, Bolivia
- Region served: Bolivia
- Services: Wildlife refuge
- Method: Volunteering
- Website: sendaverde.org

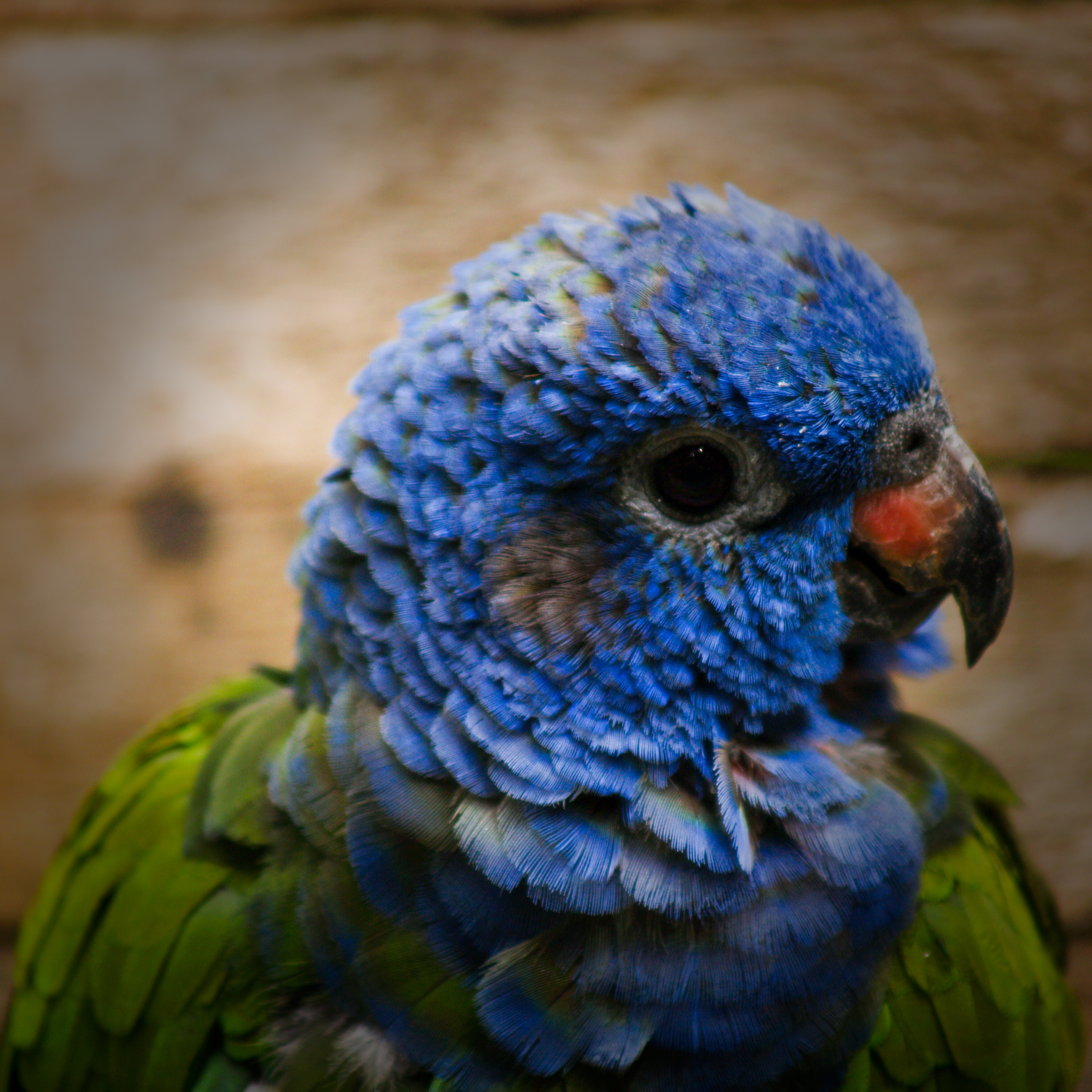
Blue-headed Parrot at La Senda Verde Animal Refuge

Tilcayo at La Senda Verde.

La Senda Verde is a non-government organization dedicated to environmental education and the care of sick, mistreated and abandoned wildlife. It is a privately run animal refuge in the Yungas area of Bolivia along the Yungas Road. The organization was co-founded by Vicky Ossio and Marcelo Levy in 2003.

In 2010, Corporación Minera de Bolivia began work on a gold mine in a riverbed of the Coroico River. In January 2010, the movement of the river channel caused by backhoes flooded some parts of La Senda Verde. In the aftermath, Ossio said that the damage to the animal shelter had been tremendous.

In September 2026, the wildlife rescue center became associated with the identification of Leopardus tilcayo, a newly described species of wildcat from Bolivia's Yungas cloud forests. The species was identified through genetic research after an unusual small wildcat was brought to the sanctuary in 2016, where it initially attracted attention because its appearance did not match known tiger cat species.

== See also ==
- Tourism in Bolivia
- Animal sanctuary
