= Babou (ocelot) =

Pet ocelot of Salvador Dalí

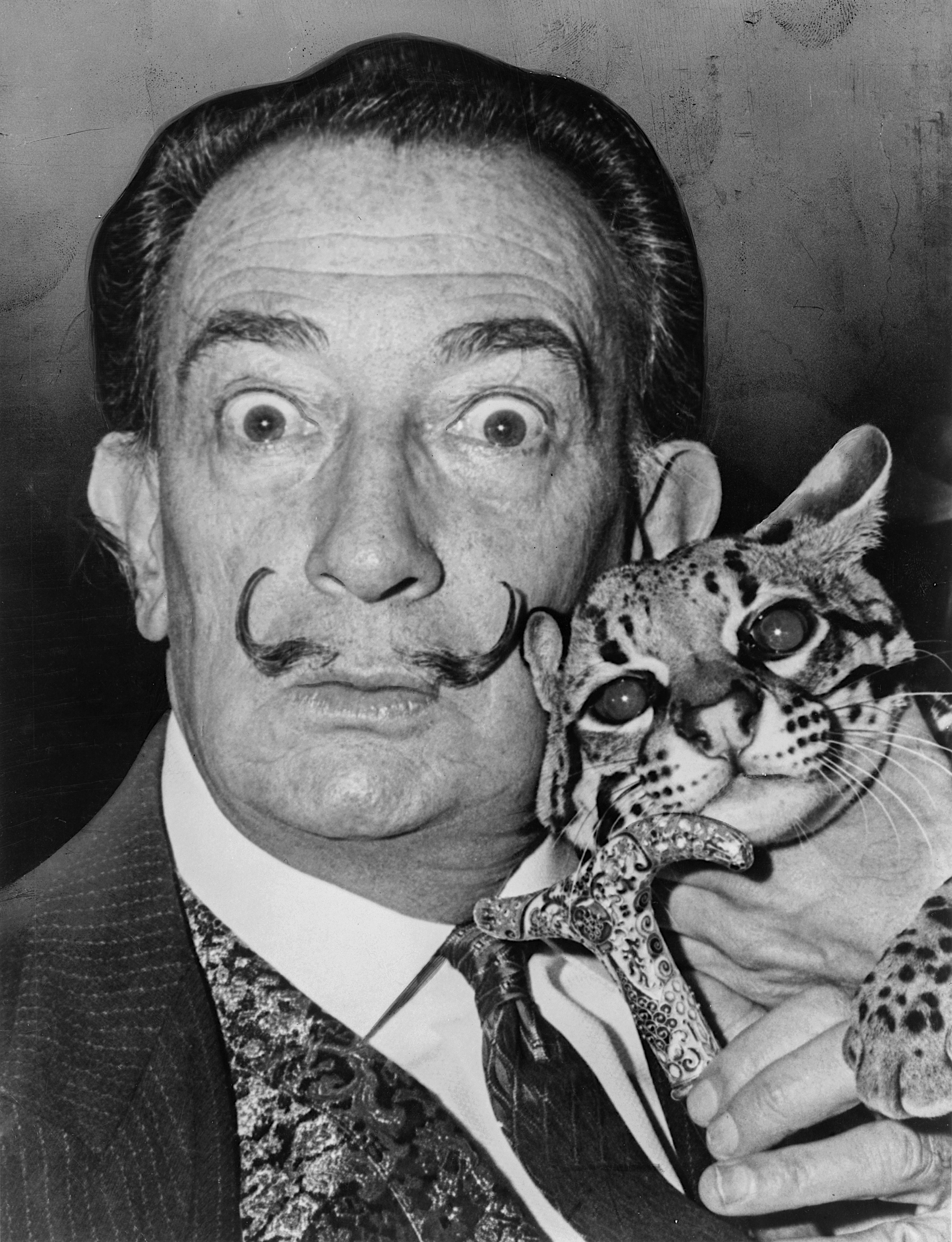
Salvador Dalí (left) and Babou (right), 1965

Babou was a pet ocelot and frequent companion of the surrealist artist Salvador Dalí in the 1960s. A cat lover, Dalí claimed to have been given the animal by the head of state of Colombia. Babou's date of death is unknown.

== Life with Dalí ==
In the 1960s, Babou was frequently seen with Dalí, who claimed to have been given the wild ocelot by the head of state of Colombia. Dalí had always been a cat lover and had an interest in exotic animals. He enjoyed a visual pun and would sometimes wear a cat pattern or coloured coat when travelling with Babou. In 1969, he was photographed leaving a Paris metro station with an anteater on a lead.

For a time in the 1960s, Dalí was more often than not accompanied by Babou. In a restaurant in Manhattan, although Babou's leash was tethered to the table, a fellow diner became quite alarmed until Dalí assured her that Babou was an ordinary cat “painted over in an op art design." On another occasion, when Babou and Dalí were visiting a gallery in Paris, Babou "made a nuisance" on some valuable 17th-century lithographs. Dalí claimed that the connection with him could only increase their value and the dealer increased the price of the lithographs by 50%. Dalí also agreed to sell the dealer a batch of his lithographs to placate him.

In 1970, Robert Wernick reported in Life magazine that Babou had a younger companion named Bouba who was led into the hotel Meurice on a leash by one of Dali's assistants and made sick by the hotel's revolving doors. The Meurice was a luxury hotel in Paris since 1815, where Dalí was a regular guest for 30 years in its best known suite, the Royal Suite, which had been home to King Alfonso XIII during his exile from Spain. Writing in his memoirs, the actor Carlos Lozano (a friend of Dalí) stated, “I only saw the ocelot smile once, the day it escaped and sent the guests at the Meurice scurrying like rats for cover.”

Babou also accompanied Dalí on a transatlantic crossing on the SS France.
