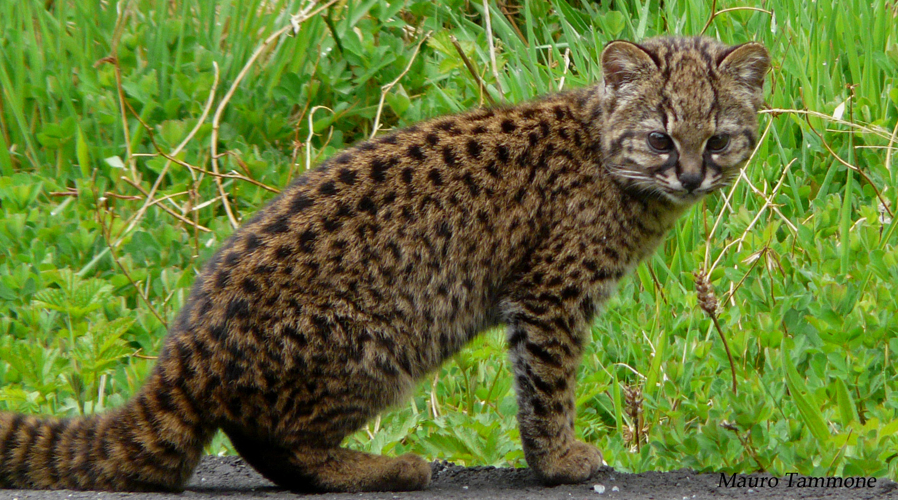

Conservation status
- Least Concern (IUCN 3.1)
- CITES Appendix II

Scientific classification
- Kingdom: Animalia
- Phylum: Chordata
- Class: Mammalia
- Order: Carnivora
- Family: Felidae
- Genus: Leopardus
- Species: L. guigna

Binomial name
- Leopardus guigna (Molina, 1782)

Subspecies
- L. g. guigna (Molina, 1782); L. g. tigrillo (Schinz, 1844)
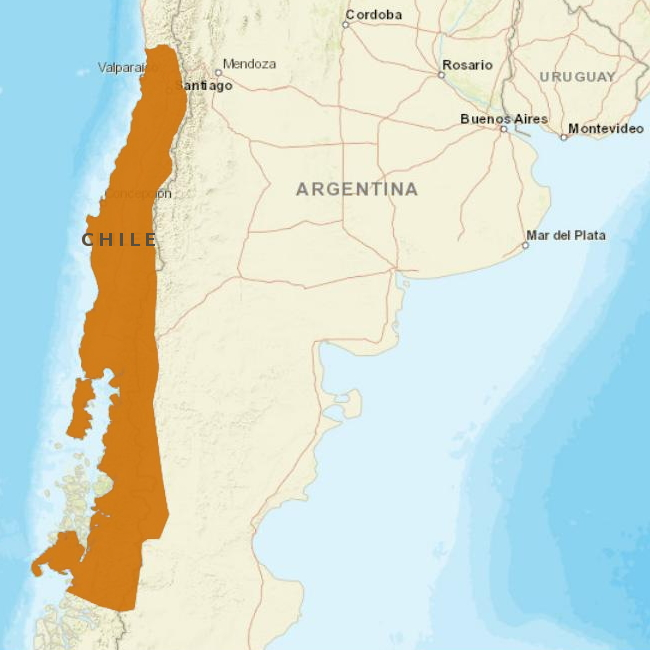
- Distribution of the Guigna, 2015

Synonyms
- Oncifelis guigna

= Kodkod =

Small wild cat

The kodkod (Leopardus guigna), also called güiña, or Chilean cat, is the smallest felid species native to the Americas. It lives primarily in central and southern Chile, as well as marginally in adjoining areas of Argentina. Between 1996 and 2002, it was listed as Vulnerable on the IUCN Red List as the total population was thought to be fewer than 10,000 mature individuals; it is threatened by persecution, habitat loss, and loss of prey base.

== Characteristics ==
The kodkod's fur color ranges from brownish-yellow to grey-brown. It has dark spots, a pale underside and a ringed tail. The ears are black with a white spot, while the dark spots on the shoulders and neck almost merge to form a series of dotted streaks. Melanistic kodkods with spotted black coats are quite common. It has a small head, large feet, and a thick tail. Adult kodkods are 37 to 51 cm (15 to 20 in) in head to body length with a short 20–25 cm (7.9–9.8 in) tail and a shoulder height of about 25 cm (9.8 in). Weight ranges between 2 and 2.5 kg (4.4 and 5.5 lb).

=== Melanistic phenotype ===
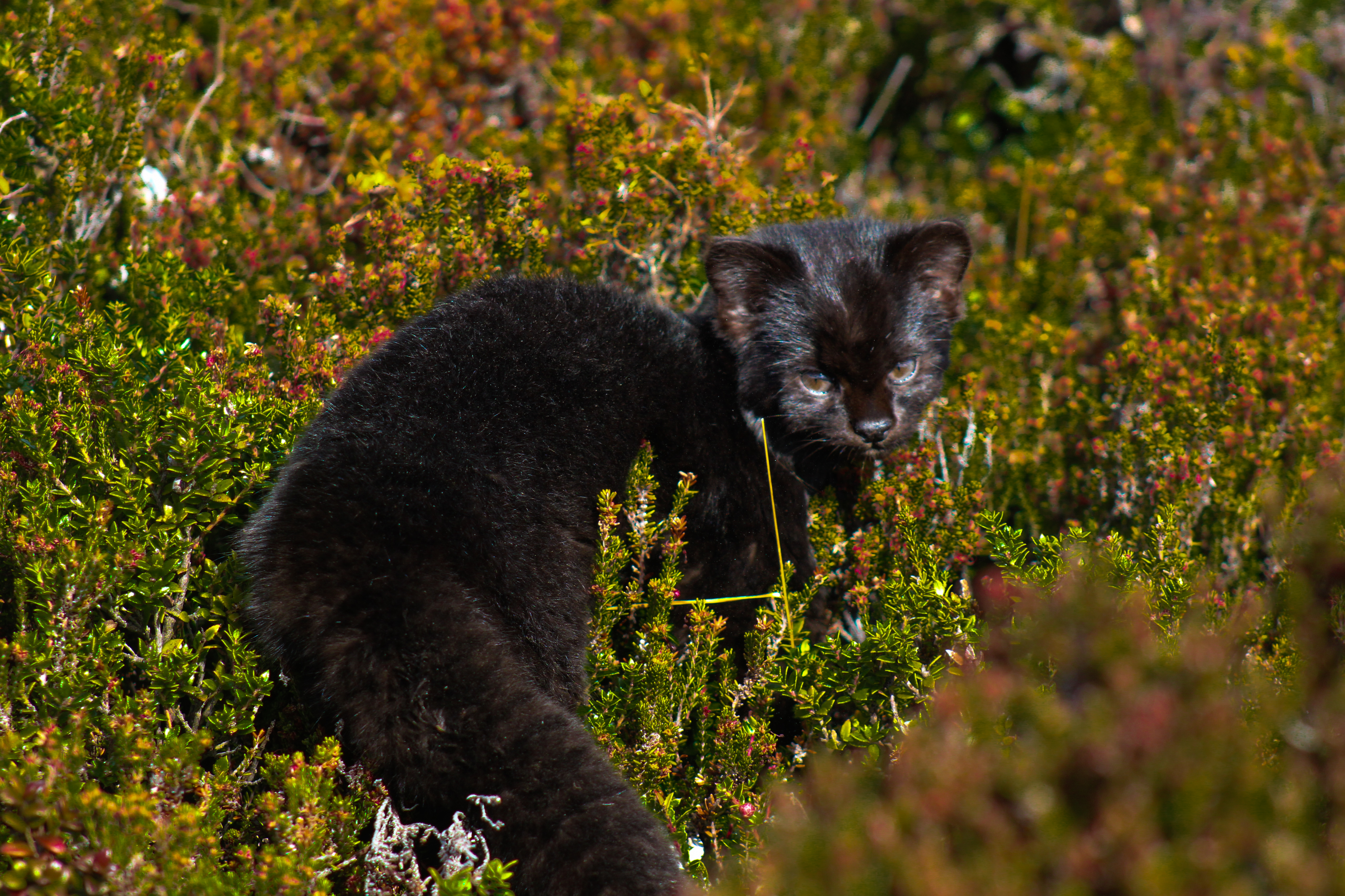
Melanistic kodkod

The melanistic phenotype is caused by the deletion of a single cysteine amino acid at position 126 of Agouti-signaling protein. This disrupts one of the four disulphide bonds in the normal protein, altering its protein structure and reducing its ability to bind to the melanocortin 1 receptor.

== Taxonomy ==
Felis guigna was the scientific name used in 1782 by Juan Ignacio Molina who first described a kodkod from Chile. Felis tigrillo was the name used in 1844 by Heinrich Rudolf Schinz.

The genus Leopardus was proposed in 1842 by John Edward Gray, when he described two spotted cat skins from Central America and two from India in the collection of the Natural History Museum, London. The subgenera Oncifelis and Noctifelis were proposed in 1851 by Nikolai Severtzov with the Geoffroy's cat and kodkod ("F. guigna Molina") as the respective type species. The kodkod was subordinated to Leopardus in 1958, and to Oncifelis in 1978.

Today, the genus Leopardus is widely recognized as valid, with two kodkod subspecies:

- L. g. guigna (Molina, 1782) occurs in southern Chile and Argentina
- L. g. tigrillo (Schinz, 1844) occurs in central and northern Chile

Genomic sequencing and molecular phylogeny studies indicate that the kodkod's closest relative is Geoffroy's cat, and that those two species are part of a clade containing also the tigrinas (oncillas). Lescroart et al. (2023) proposed recognising subgenus Oncifelis for this grouping, alongside the pampas cats Lynchailurus, and the nominate Leopardus (ocelot, margay, and Andean mountain cat).

== Distribution and habitat ==
The kodkod is strongly associated with mixed temperate rainforests of the southern Andean and coastal ranges, particularly the Valdivian and Araucaria forests of Chile, which is characterized by the presence of bamboo in the understory. It prefers evergreen temperate rainforest habitats to deciduous temperate moist forests, sclerophyllous scrub and coniferous forests. It is tolerant of altered habitats, being found in secondary forest and shrub as well as primary forest, and on the fringes of settled and cultivated areas. It ranges up to the treeline at approximately 1,900 m (6,200 ft). In Argentina, it has been recorded from moist montane forest, which has Valdivian temperate rain forest characteristics, including a multi-layered structure with bamboo, and numerous lianas and epiphytes.

== Ecology and behavior ==
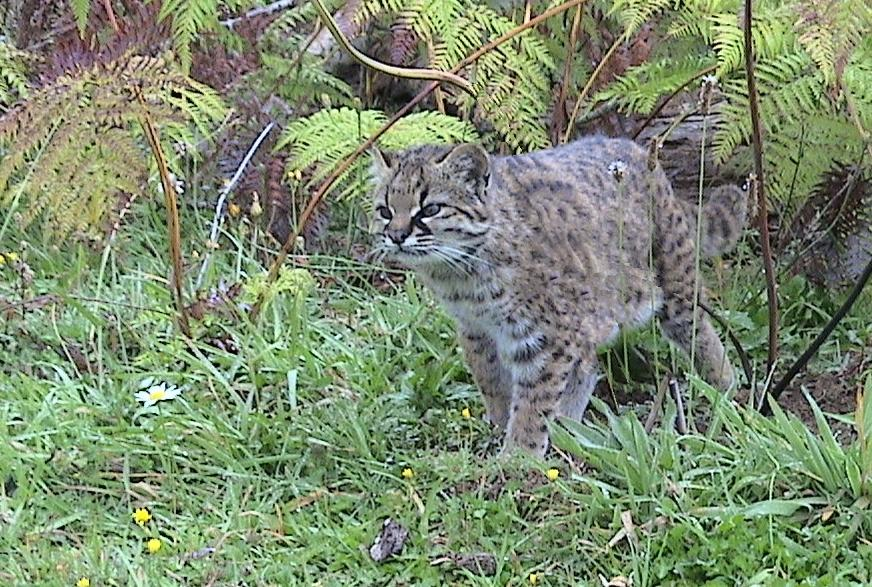
An alert Guigna (Kodkod)

Kodkods are equally active during the day and during the night, although they only venture into open terrain under the cover of darkness. During the day, they rest in dense vegetation in ravines, along streams with heavy cover, and in piles of dead gorse. They are excellent climbers, and easily able to climb trees more than a meter in diameter. They are terrestrial predators of birds, lizards and rodents in the ravines and forested areas, feeding on southern lapwing, austral thrush, chucao tapaculo, huet-huet, domestic geese and chicken.

Male kodkods maintain exclusive territories 1.1 to 2.5 km^{2} (0.42 to 0.97 sq mi) in size, while females occupy smaller ranges of just 0.5 to 0.7 km^{2} (0.19 to 0.27 sq mi).

=== Reproduction ===
The gestation period lasts about 72–78 days. The average litter size is one to three kittens. This species may live to be about 11 years old.

== Threats ==
The kodkod is listed as Least concern on the IUCN Red List as the total population is greater than 10,000 mature individuals, though it was formerly Vulnerable. It is threatened foremost by logging, which entails the spread of pine forest plantations and agriculture, particularly in central Chile. In 1997 to 1998, two out of five radio-collared kodkods were killed on Chiloé Island after raiding chicken coops.
