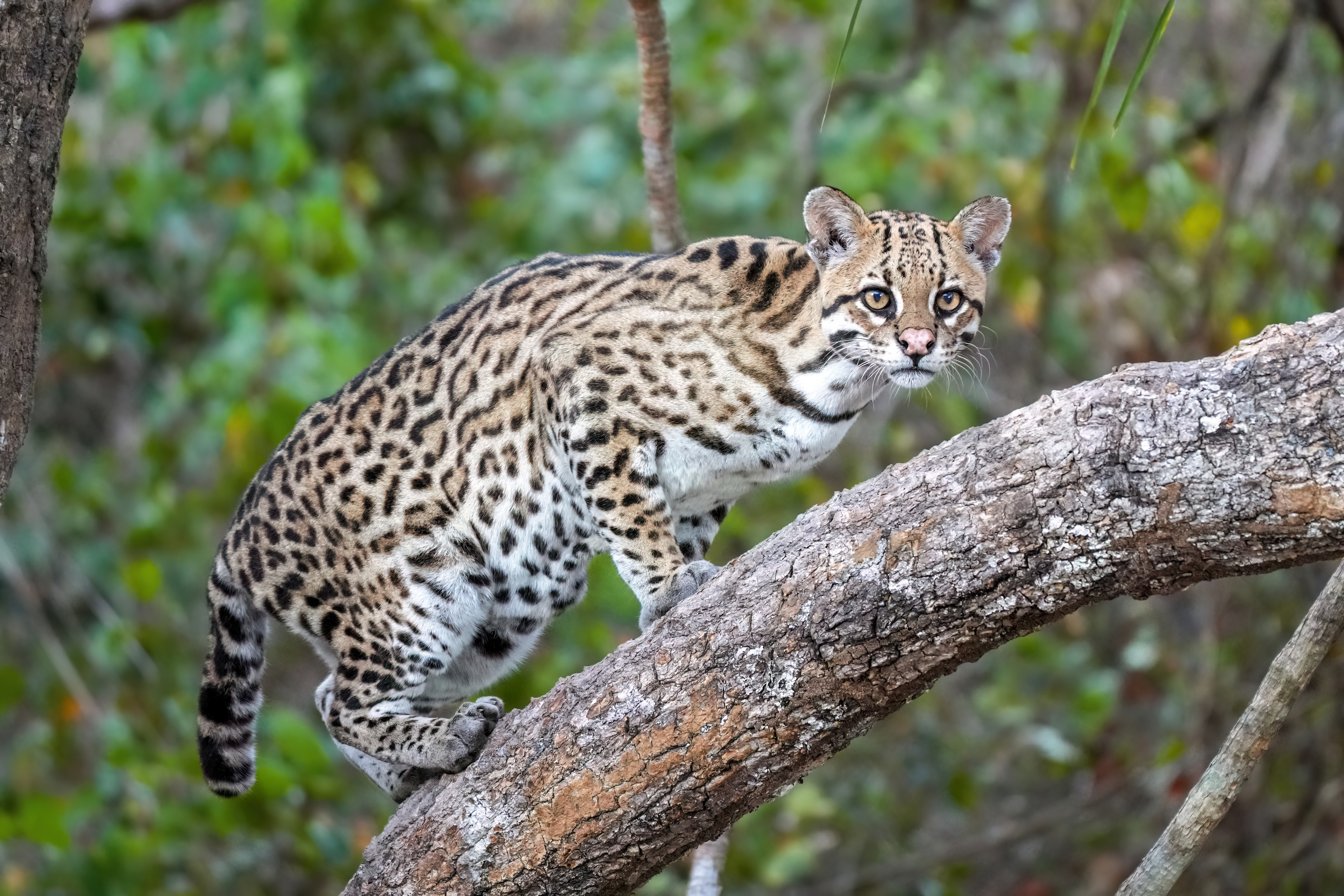
- An ocelot in Mato Grosso in Brazil

Conservation status
- Least Concern (IUCN 3.1)
- CITES Appendix I

Scientific classification
- Kingdom: Animalia
- Phylum: Chordata
- Class: Mammalia
- Order: Carnivora
- Family: Felidae
- Genus: Leopardus
- Species: L. pardalis

Binomial name
- Leopardus pardalis (Linnaeus, 1758)

Subspecies
- L. p. mitis (Cuvier, 1820); L. p. pardalis (Linnaeus, 1758)
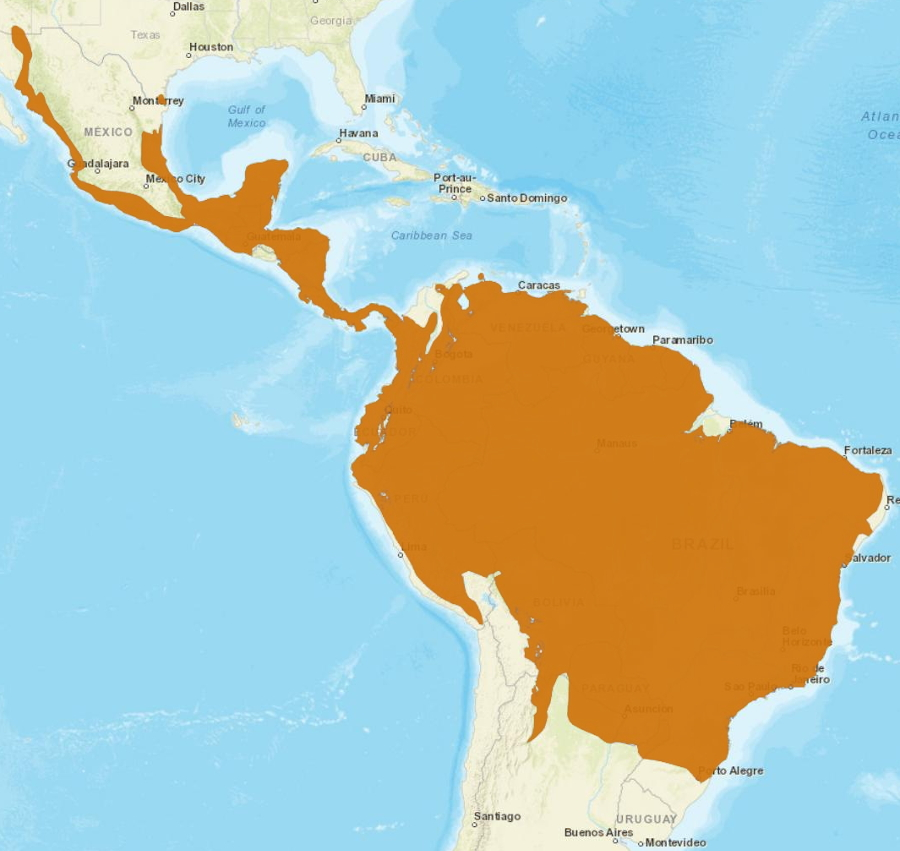
- Distribution of the ocelot (2016)

Synonyms
- List: Felis aequatorialis (Mearns, 1903); F. albescens (Pucheran, 1855); F. armillatus (Cuvier, 1820); F. brasiliensis (Schinz, 1844); F. buffoni (Brass, 1911); F. canescens (Swainson, 1838); F. chati (Gray, 1827); F. chibi-gouazou Gray, 1827); F. grifithii (J. B. Fischer, 1829); F. hamiltonii (J. B. Fischer, 1829); F. limitis (Mearns, 1902); F. ludoviciana (Brass, 1911); F. maracaya (Wagner, 1841); F. maripensis (Allen, 1904); F. mearnsi (Allen, 1904; F. melanura (Ball, 1844); F. mexicana (Kerr, 1792); F. mitis (Cuvier, 1820); F. ocelot (Link, 1795); F. pardalis (Linnaeus, 1758); F. pseudopardalis (Boitard, 1842); F. sanctaemartae (Allen, 1904); F. smithii (Swainson, 1838); Leopardus griseus Gray, 1842; L. pictus Gray, 1842

= Ocelot =

Species of wild cat

The ocelot (Leopardus pardalis) is a medium-sized spotted wild cat that reaches 40–50 cm (16–20 in) at the shoulders and weighs between 7 and 15.5 kg (15 and 34 lb) on average. It is native to the southwestern United States, Mexico, Central and South America, and the Caribbean islands of Trinidad and Margarita. Carl Linnaeus scientifically described it in 1758. Two subspecies are recognized.

The ocelot is efficient at climbing, leaping and swimming. It prefers areas close to water sources with dense vegetation cover and high prey availability. It preys on small terrestrial mammals, such as armadilloes, opossums, and lagomorphs. It is typically active during twilight and at night and tends to be solitary and territorial. Both sexes become sexually mature at around two years of age and can breed throughout the year; peak mating season varies geographically. After a gestation period of two to three months, the female gives birth to a litter of one to three kittens. They stay with their mother for up to two years, after which they leave to establish their own home ranges.

The ocelot is listed as Least Concern on the IUCN Red List and is threatened by habitat destruction, hunting, and traffic accidents. While its range is very large, various populations are decreasing in many parts of its range. The association of the ocelot with humans dates back to the Aztec and Incan civilizations; it has occasionally been kept as a pet.

== Etymology ==
The name "ocelot" comes from the Nahuatl word ōcēlōtl (pronounced [oːˈseːloːt͡ɬ]), which generally refers to the jaguar, rather than the ocelot. Another possible origin for the name is the Latin ocellatus ("having little eyes" or "marked with eye-like spots"), in reference to the cat's spotted coat.

Other vernacular names for the ocelot include cunaguaro (Venezuela), gato onza (Argentina), gato tigre (Panama), heitigrikati (Suriname), jaguatirica, maracaja (Brazil), manigordo (Costa Rica, Panama and Venezuela), mathuntori, ocelote, onsa, pumillo, tiger cat (Belize), tigrecillo (Bolivia) and tigrillo (Colombia, Ecuador, Guatemala, and Peru).

== Taxonomy ==
Felis pardalis was the scientific name proposed for the ocelot by Carl Linnaeus in 1758. The genus Leopardus was proposed by John Edward Gray in 1842 for several spotted cat skins in the collection of the Natural History Museum, London.

Several ocelot specimens were described in the nineteenth and twentieth centuries, including:

- Felis mitis by Frédéric Cuvier in 1824 was a specimen from Rio de Janeiro, Brazil.
- F. chibi-gouazou by Edward Griffith in 1827 was based on earlier descriptions and illustrations.
- Leopardus griseus by John Edward Gray in 1842 was a spotted cat skin from Central America.
- F. pseudopardalis by Pierre Boitard in 1845 was an ocelot kept in the Jardin des plantes.
- F. melanura by Robert Ball in 1844 was a specimen from British Guiana.
- F. albescens by Jacques Pucheran in 1855 was a specimen from Brownsville, Texas.
- F. aequatorialis by Edgar Alexander Mearns in 1903 was a skin of an adult female ocelot from Talamanca canton in Costa Rica.
- F. maripensis and F. sanctaemartae by Joel Asaph Allen in 1904 were skins of two adult female ocelots from Maripa, Venezuela and Santa Marta district in Colombia, respectively.
- F. pardalis pusaea by Oldfield Thomas in 1914 was an ocelot skin and skull from Guayas Province in coastal Ecuador.
- F. pardalis nelsoni and F. p. sonoriensis by Edward Alphonso Goldman in 1925 as subspecies of F. pardalis, based on specimens from Manzanillo and the Mayo River region respectively in Mexico.
- L. pardalis steinbachi by Reginald Innes Pocock in 1941 was a specimen from Buena Vista, Ichilo in Bolivia.

=== Subspecies ===
In 1919, Allen reviewed the specimens described until 1914, placed them into the genus Leopardus and recognized nine subspecies as valid taxa based on the colors and spot patterns of skins. In 1941, Pocock reviewed dozens of ocelot skins in the collection of the Natural History Museum and regrouped them to nine different subspecies, also based on their colors and spots. Later authors recognized 10 subspecies as valid.

In 1998, results of a mtDNA control region analysis of ocelot samples indicated that four major ocelot groups exist, one each in Central America, northwestern South America, northeastern South America and southern South America south of the Amazon River. A 2010 study of morphological features noted significant differences in the size and color of the Central and South American populations, suggesting they could be separate species. In 2013, a study of craniometric variation and microsatellite diversity in ocelots throughout the range recognized three subspecies: L. p. albescens from the Texas–Mexico border, L. p. pardis from Central America and L. p. pseudopardalis from South America, though L. p. mitis may comprise the ocelot population in the southern part of South America.

In 2017, the Cat Classification Task Force of the IUCN Cat Specialist Group noted that up to four subspecies can be identified, but recognized only two as valid taxa. These two taxa differ in morphological features and are geographically separated by the Andes:

- L. p. pardalis has a greyish fur. Its range extends from Texas and Arizona to Costa Rica.
- L. p. mitis has a more yellowish fur and is larger than pardalis. It occurs in South America as far south as northern Argentina.

=== Phylogeny ===
Results of a phylogenetic study indicate that the Leopardus lineage genetically diverged from the Felidae around 8 million years ago (mya). The ocelot is estimated to have diverged from the margay (Leopardus wiedii) between 2.41 and 1.01 mya. The relationships of the ocelot within the Felidae is considered as follows:

- - Caracal
    - Serval (Leptailurus serval)
    - - Caracal (C. caracal)
      - African golden cat (C. aurata)
  - - Leopardus
      - - Ocelot (L. pardalis)
        - Margay (L. wiedii)
      - - - Andean mountain cat (L. jacobita)
          - Pampas cat (L. colocola)
        - - - Geoffroy's cat (L. geoffroyi)
            - Kodkod (L. guigna)
          - Oncilla (L. tigrinus)
    - - Lynx
        - Bobcat (L. rufus)
        - - Canada lynx (L. canadensis)
          - - Eurasian lynx (L. lynx)
            - Iberian lynx (L. pardinus)
      - - Puma
          - Cougar (P. concolor)

== Characteristics ==
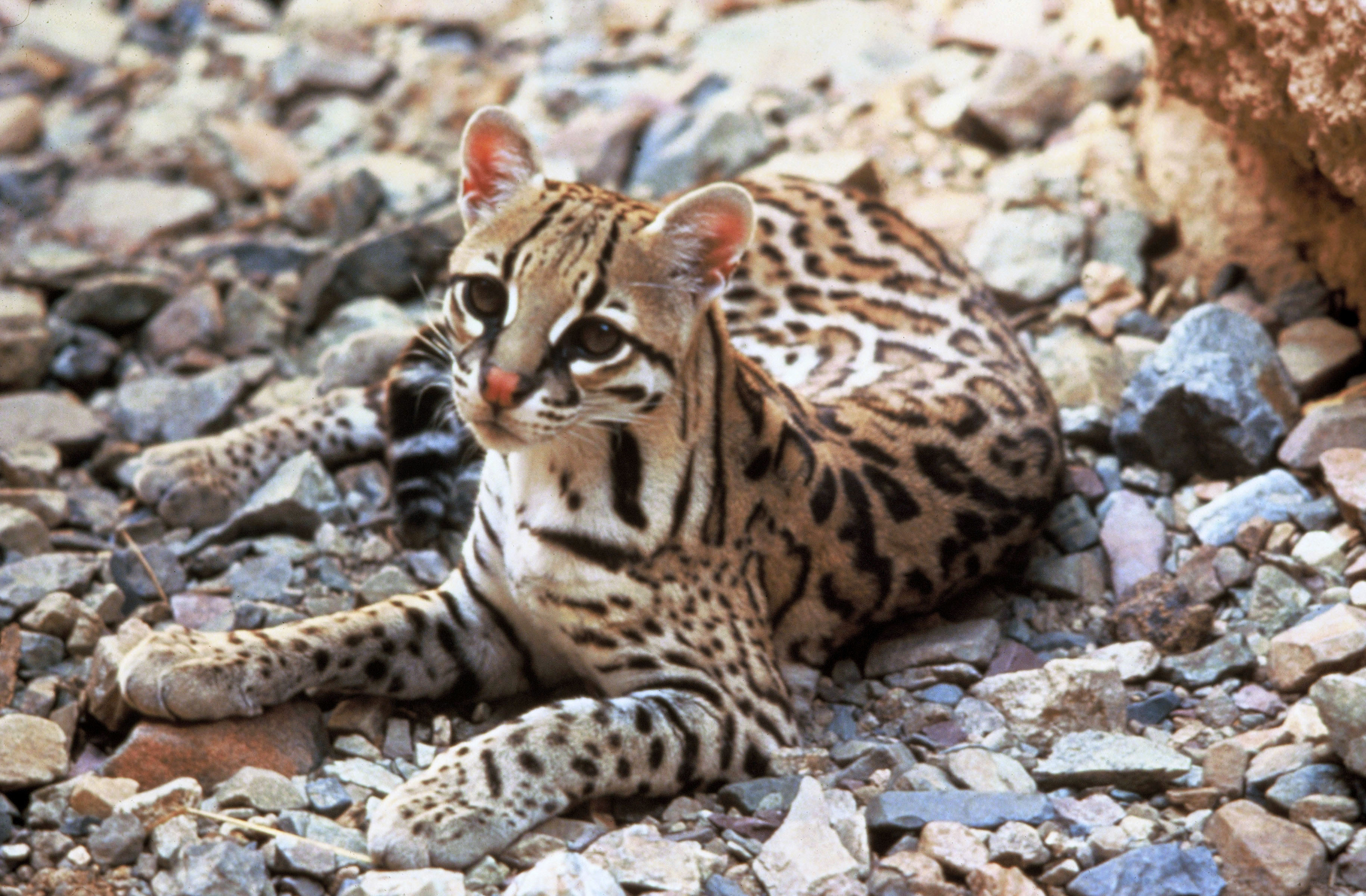
The ocelot is not significantly sexually dimorphic, varying only slightly in mature maximum weight.

The ocelot's fur is extensively marked with solid black markings on a creamy, tawny, yellowish, reddish gray or gray background color. The spots on the head and limbs are small, but markings on the back, cheeks, and flanks are open or closed bands and stripes. A few dark stripes run straight from the back of the neck up to the tip of the tail. Its neck and undersides are white, and the insides of the legs are marked with a few horizontal streaks. Its round ears are marked with a bright white spot. Its fur is short, about 0.8 cm (0.31 in) long on the belly, but with about 1 cm (0.39 in) long guard hairs on the back. The body has a notably strong odor. Each ocelot has a unique color pattern, which can be used to identify individuals. Its eyes are brown, but reflect in a golden hue when illuminated. It has 28 to 30 teeth, with the dental formula 3.1.2–3.13.1.2.1. It has a bite force quotient at the canine tip of 113.8. Only one ocelot is known to possess albinism, and the appearance of such a trait in ocelots is likely an indication of shrinking populations due to deforestation.

With a head-and-body length ranging from 55 to 100 cm (22 to 39 in) and a 30 to 45 cm (12 to 18 in) long tail, the ocelot is the largest member of the genus Leopardus. It typically reaches 40–50 cm (16–20 in) at the shoulder. The weight of females ranges between 7 and 12 kg (15 and 26 lb) and of males between 8 and 18 kg (18 and 40 lb). Its footprint measures nearly 5 cm × 5 cm (2.0 in × 2.0 in).

The ocelot can be confused with the margay (Leopardus wiedii) and the oncilla (L. tigrinus), though the ocelot is noticeably larger and heavier with a shorter tail. Though all three have rosettes on their coats, the ocelot typically has a more blotched pattern; the oncilla has dark spots on its underbelly unlike the other two. Other differences lie in the facial markings, appearance of the tail and fur characteristics. The ocelot is similar in size to a bobcat (Lynx rufus), though larger individuals have occasionally been recorded. The jaguar is notably larger and heavier, and has rosettes instead of spots and stripes.

== Distribution and habitat ==
Two ocelots, mother and daughter, in a wooded area of the Pantanal wetlands; at night, they encounter fewer humans on this farm.

The ocelot ranges from the southwestern United States to northern Argentina, up to an elevation of 3,000 m (9,800 ft). In the United States, it occurs in Texas and Arizona, and is extirpated from Louisiana and Arkansas. Ocelot fossils have been found in Florida.

It inhabits tropical forests, thorn forests, mangrove swamps and savannas. In the Amazon rainforest, it prefers habitats with availability of prey and water, and tends to avoid other predators. It favors areas with dense forest cover and water sources, far from roads and human settlement, avoiding steep slopes and highly elevated areas. In areas where ocelots coexist with larger predators such as cougars and humans, they tune their active hours to avoid them, and seek dense cover to avoid competitors. It can adapt well to its surroundings; as such, factors other than the aforementioned are not significant in its choice of habitat.

It shares a large part of its range with the jaguar, jaguarundi, margay, oncilla and cougar.

== Ecology and behavior ==
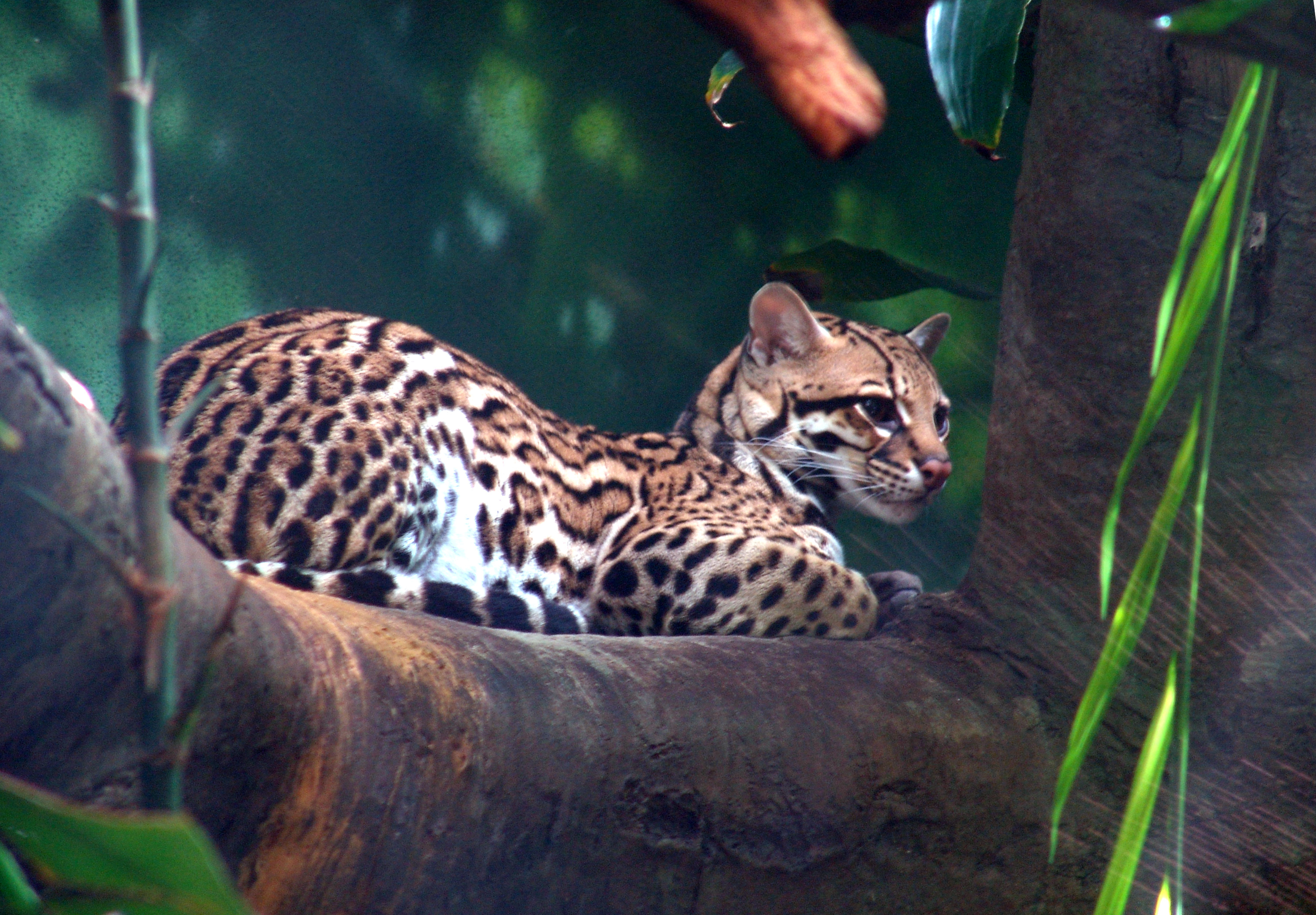
Ocelot resting in a tree

The ocelot is usually solitary and active mainly during twilight and at night. Radio collared individuals in the Cocha Cashu Biological Station in Peru rested during the day and became active earliest in the late afternoon; they moved between 3.2 and 17 hours until dawn and then returned to their dens.

During the daytime, it rests on trees, in dens below large trees or other cool, sheltered sites on the ground. It is agile in climbing and leaping, and escapes predators by jumping on trees. It is also an efficient swimmer. It scent-marks its territory by spraying urine. The territories of males are 3.5–46 km^{2} (1.4–17.8 sq mi) large, while those of females cover 0.8–15 km^{2} (0.31–5.79 sq mi). Territories of females rarely overlap, whereas the territory of a male includes those of two to three females. Social interaction between sexes is minimal, though a few adults have been observed together even in non-mating periods, and some juveniles interact with their parents. Data from camera trapping studies confirm that several ocelot individuals deposit scat in one or several communal sites, called latrines. Ocelots can be aggressive in defending their territory, fighting even to death.

The population density of ocelots has been observed to be high in areas with high rainfall, but tends to decrease with increasing latitude; highest densities have been recorded in the tropics. In 2014, the ocelot population density in Barro Colorado Island was estimated to be 1.59–1.74/km^{2} (4.1–4.5/sq mi), greater than 0.984/km^{2} (2.55/sq mi) recorded in northwestern Amazon in Peru in 2010, which was the densest ocelot population recorded thus far.

Potential predators of ocelot kittens in Texas include people, cougars, coyotes, American alligators, great horned owls, bobcats, feral dogs, feral pigs, crotalid pit vipers and colubrid constrictors. Studies have found that adult ocelots are vulnerable to predation by both cougars and jaguars, with decreasing water sources in Guatemala causing predatory encounters with the latter.

=== Hunting and diet ===
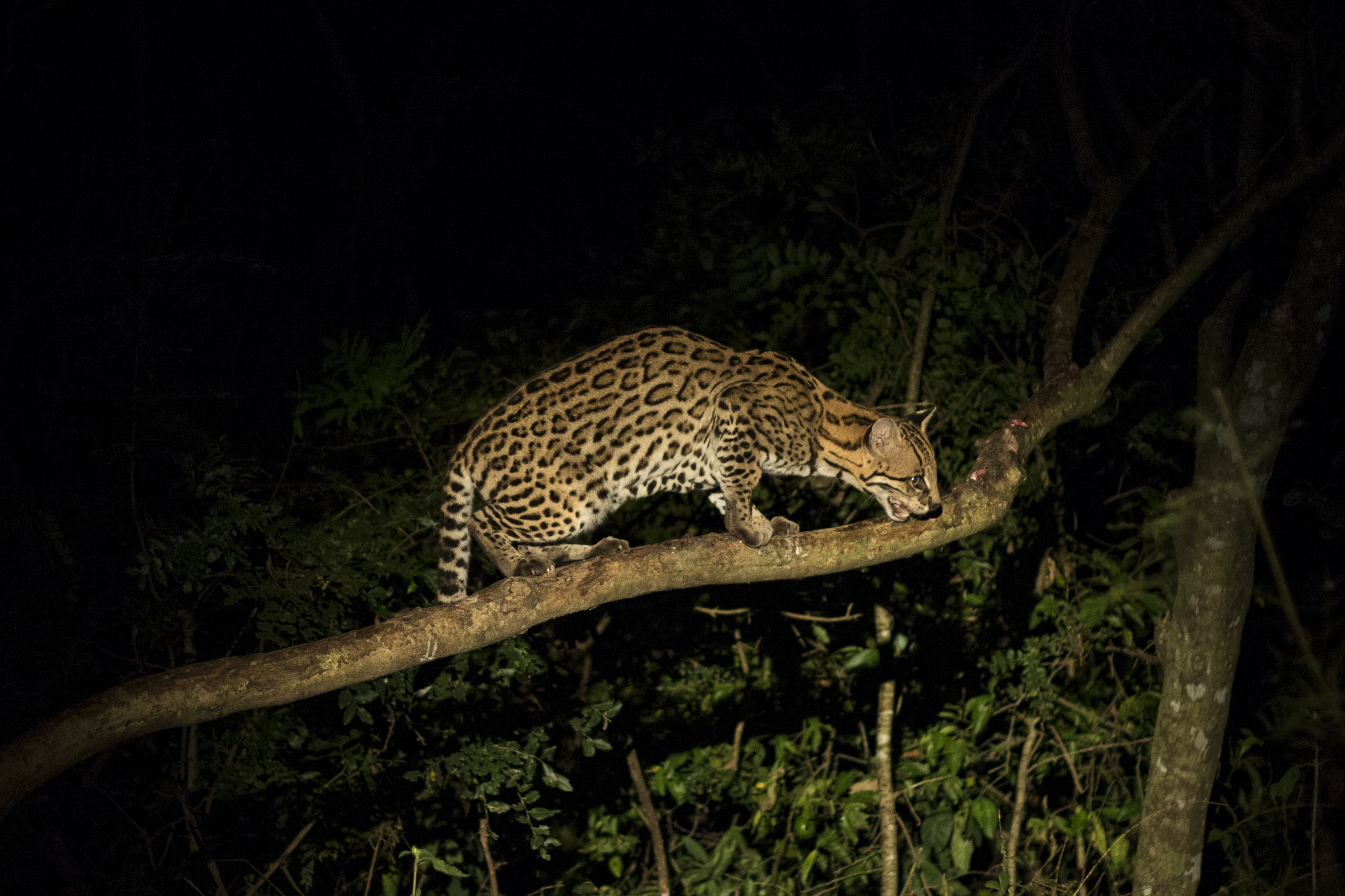
An ocelot hunting at night

Ocelots have been observed to follow scent trails in search for prey, walking at a speed of about 0.3 km/h (0.2 mph). Alternatively, an ocelot may wait for prey for 30 to 60 minutes at a certain site and move to another walking at 0.8–1.4 km/h (0.50–0.87 mph) if unsuccessful. An ocelot typically prefers hunting in areas with vegetation cover, avoiding open areas, especially on moonlit nights, so as not to be seen by the prey. As a carnivore, it preys on small terrestrial mammals such as rodents, lagomorphs, armadillos, opossums, also fish, crustaceans, insects, reptiles and birds. It usually feeds on the kill immediately, but removes bird feathers before. It typically preys on animals that weigh less than 1 kg (2.2 lb), but rarely targets large ungulates such as deer, sheep and peccaries, as well as anteaters, New World monkeys and iguanas. It requires 600–800 g (21–28 oz) of food every day to satisfy its energy requirements.

Primates prevail in the diet of ocelots in southeastern Brazil and iguanas in a tropical deciduous forest in Mexico. The composition of the diet varies by season; in Venezuela, ocelots were found to prefer iguanas and rodents in the dry season and then switch to land crabs in the wet season. In the Atlantic rainforest, ocelots have a similar prey preference as margays and oncillas. In the Cerrado, an ocelot was recorded dragging a dead calf.

=== Reproduction and life cycle ===
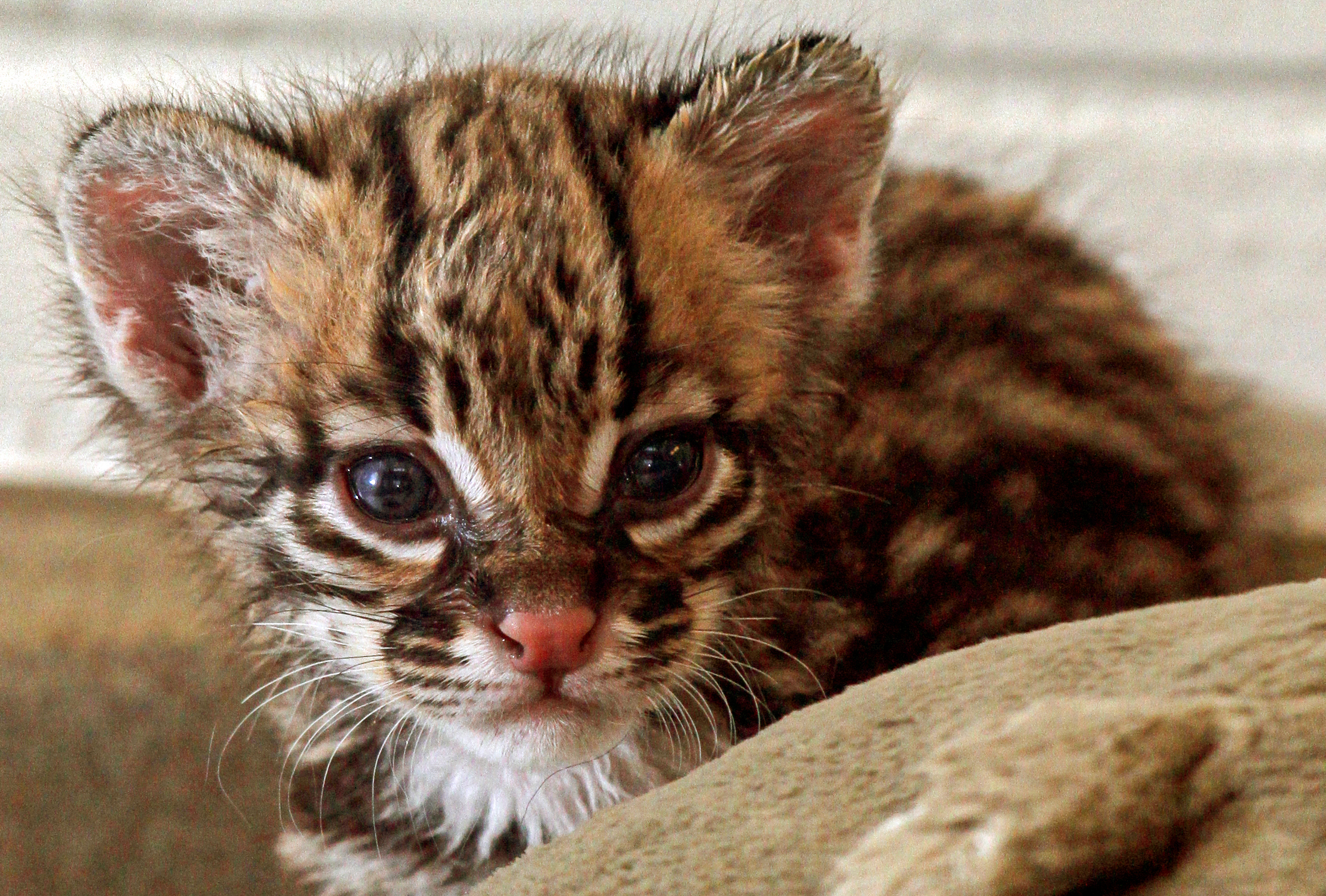
An ocelot kitten

Both male and female ocelots produce a long-range "yowl" in the mating season and a short-range "meow". Ocelots can mate any time during the year. The peak mating season varies geographically; in Argentina and Paraguay, peaks have been observed in autumn, in Mexico and Texas in autumn and winter. Estrus lasts four to five days and recurs every 25 days in a non-pregnant female. A study in southern Brazil showed that sperm production in ocelots, margays and oncillas peaks in summer. When mating, captive ocelots spend more time together, scent-mark extensively and eat less.

The female gives birth to a litter of one to three kittens after a gestation period of two to three months. Dens are usually located in dense vegetation. A newborn kitten weighs 200–340 g (7.1–12.0 oz). The kitten is born with spots and stripes, though on a gray background; the color changes to golden as the ocelot grows older. A study in southern Texas revealed that a mother keeps a litter in a den for 13 to 64 days and shifts the young to two or three dens. The kitten's eyes open 15 to 18 days after birth. Kittens begin to leave the den at the age of three months. They remain with their mother for up to two years and then start dispersing and establishing their own territory. In comparison to other felids, ocelots have a relatively longer duration between births and a narrow litter size. Captive ocelots live for up to 20 years.

== Threats ==
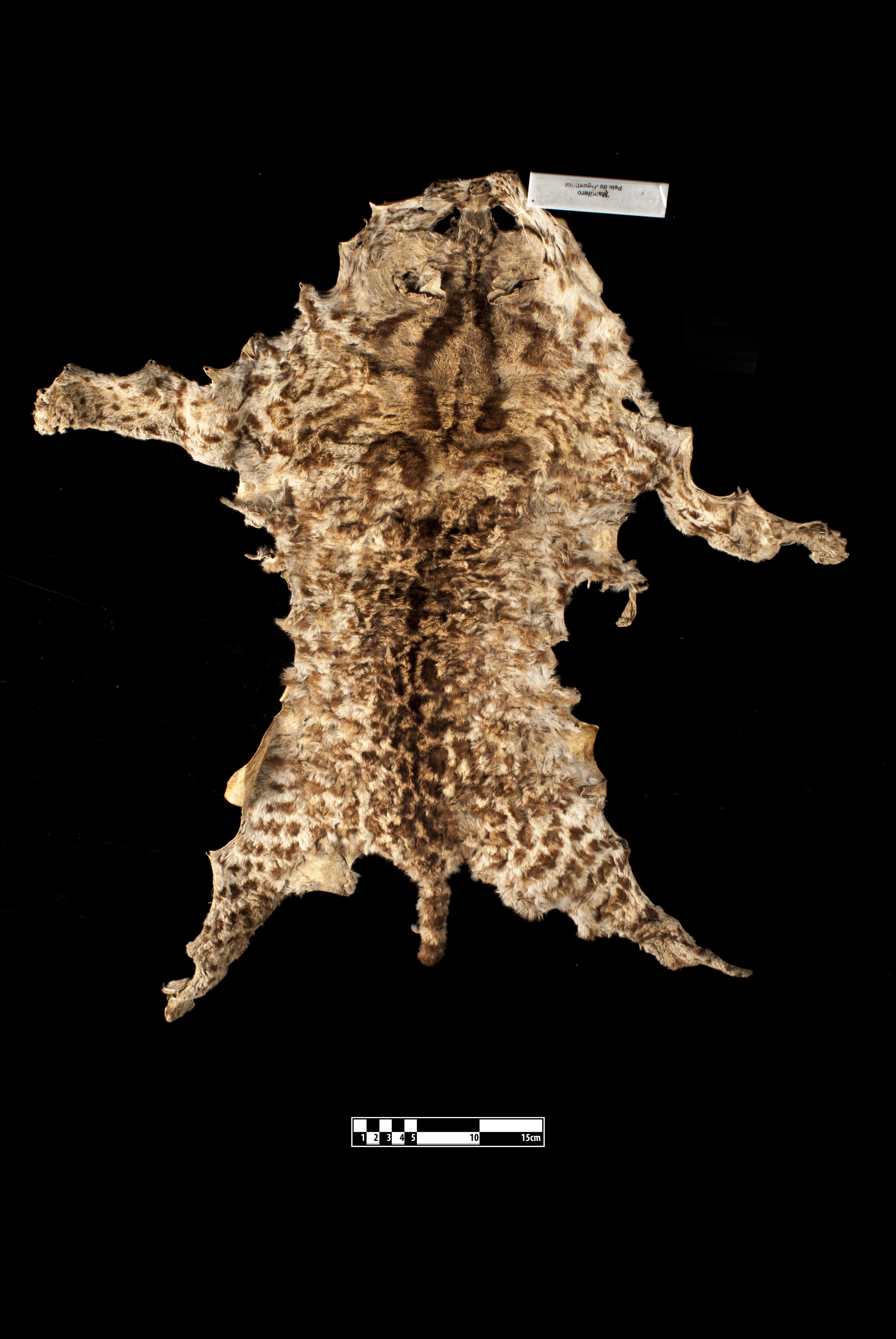
Ocelot skin

Throughout its range, the ocelot is threatened by loss and fragmentation of habitat. In Texas, the fertile land that supports dense cover and constitutes the optimum habitat for the ocelot is being lost to agriculture. The habitat is often fragmented into small pockets that cannot support ocelots well, leading to deaths due to starvation. Traffic accidents have emerged as a major threat over the years, as ocelots try to expand beyond their natural habitat to new areas and get hit by vehicles. In the Atlantic Forest in northeastern Argentina, it is affected by logging and poaching of prey species.

The fur trade was a flourishing business in the 1960s and the 1970s that resulted in severe exploitation of felids such as the ocelot and the jaguar. In the 1960s, ocelot skins were among the most highly preferred in the US, reaching an all-time high of 140,000 skins traded in 1970. This was followed by prohibitions on commercial trade of spotted cat skins in several range states such as Brazil and the US, causing ocelot skins in trade to plummet. In 1986, the European Economic Community banned import of ocelot skins, and in 1989, the ocelot was included in Appendix I of the Convention on International Trade in Endangered Species of Wild Fauna and Flora. However, hunting of ocelots for skins has continued and is still a major threat to ocelot survival.

Another threat has been the international pet trade; this typically involves capturing ocelot kittens by killing their mothers; these cats are then sold to tourists. Though it is banned in several countries, pet trade survives; in some areas of Central and South America, ocelots are still sold in a few local markets.

== Conservation ==
The ocelot is listed as Least Concern on the IUCN Red List because of its wide distribution in the Americas. Ocelot hunting is banned in Argentina, Brazil, Bolivia, Colombia, Costa Rica, French Guiana, Guatemala, Honduras, Mexico, Nicaragua, Panama, Paraguay, Suriname, Trinidad and Tobago, the United States, Uruguay, and Venezuela; hunting is regulated in Peru. As of 2013, the global population was estimated at more than 40,000 mature individuals. Ocelot populations were stable in some Amazon basin areas as of 2013. As of 2012, the ocelot population in Argentina's subtropical regions was estimated to consist of 1,500 to 8,000 mature individuals. It has been recorded in oil palm landscapes and big cattle ranches in the Colombian Llanos and inter-Andean valleys.

=== In Texas ===
In Texas and northeastern Mexico, ocelot populations have reduced drastically; as of 2014, the population in Texas was estimated to be 50–80 individuals. The reduced numbers have led to increased inbreeding and low genetic diversity. Despite this, the US Fish and Wildlife Service failed to acknowledge the ocelot population in Texas as a distinct population segment worthy of listing as endangered. The US Fish and Wildlife Service, the Texas Parks and Wildlife Department and The Nature Conservancy are among agencies actively involved in ocelot conservation efforts, such as the protection and regeneration of vegetation in the Rio Grande Valley. Much of the reintroduction effort is taking place on private lands. NatureServe considers the ocelot apparently secure globally, but critically imperiled in Texas and Arizona.

=== In captivity ===
The American Zoo and Aquarium Association established a Species Survival Plan for the ocelot populations in Brazil. In 2006, the captive population in North American zoos consisted of 16 ocelots representing six founders and their offspring. Some litters were produced using artificial insemination. The Emperor Valley Zoo in Trinidad keeps confiscated and trapped ocelots.

== In culture ==
Ocelots have been associated with humans since the time of the Aztec and Incan civilizations, who depicted ocelots in their art and mythology. Representations of ocelots appear in every artistic medium, from Moche ceramics to murals, architectural details, and landscape features. Ocelot bones were made into thin, pointed instruments to pierce ears and limbs for ritual bloodletting. Several figurines depicting ocelots and similar felids are known. In her 1904 work A Penitential Rite of the Ancient Mexicans, archaeologist Zelia Nuttall described a statue depicting an ocelot or another felid excavated in Mexico City and its relation to the Aztec deity Tezcatlipoca. She argued that the sculpture depicted an ocelot, writing,

According to the well-known myth, Tezcatlipoca, when cast down from heaven by Quetzalcoatl, "fell into the water where he transformed himself into an ocelot" and arose to kill certain giants.

Moreover, she described a photograph of a seated person to corroborate her claim:

At the back of his head, above his left hand, the head of an ocelot is visible, whose skin hangs behind his back, the tail ending below his knee. Besides this the personage wears leggings made of the spotted ocelot skin and a rattlesnake girdle from which hang two conventionalized hearts. It is interesting to find that in a note written beneath its photograph the late Senor Islas de Bustamante, independently identified the above figure as a representation of "Ocelotl-Tezcatlipoca" or Tlatoca-ocelot, lit. the Lord Ocelot ... and described as wearing "the beard of the mask of Tezcatlipoca".

Like many other felids, occasionally ocelots are kept as pets. They might demand a lot of attention from their owners and have a tendency to chew on or suck on objects, such as fabric and the fingers of their owners; this can lead them to accidentally ingest objects such as tennis balls. Agile and playful, pet ocelots can be troublesome to keep due to their habit of leaping around and potentially damaging objects; ocelots may unintentionally injure their owners with bites. Nevertheless, carefully raised ocelots can be highly affectionate. Painter Salvador Dalí kept a pet ocelot named Babou that was seen with him at many places he visited, including a voyage aboard SS France. When one of the diners at a New York restaurant was alarmed by his ocelot, Dali told her that it was a common domestic cat that he had "painted over in an op art design". Opera singer Lily Pons and musician Gram Parsons are also known to have kept ocelots.

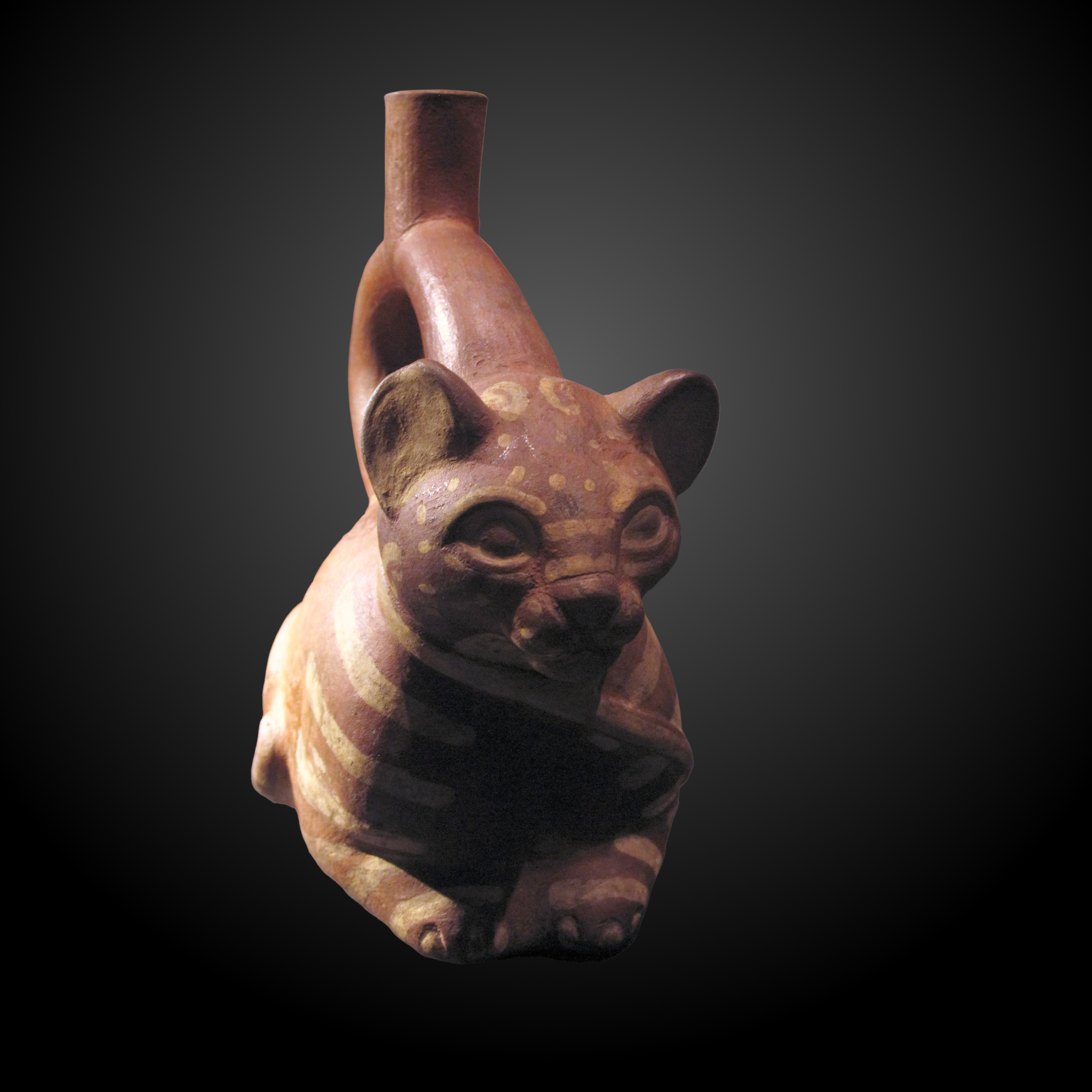
Moche ceramic bottle in the shape of an ocelot, Musée d'ethnographie de Genève, Switzerland

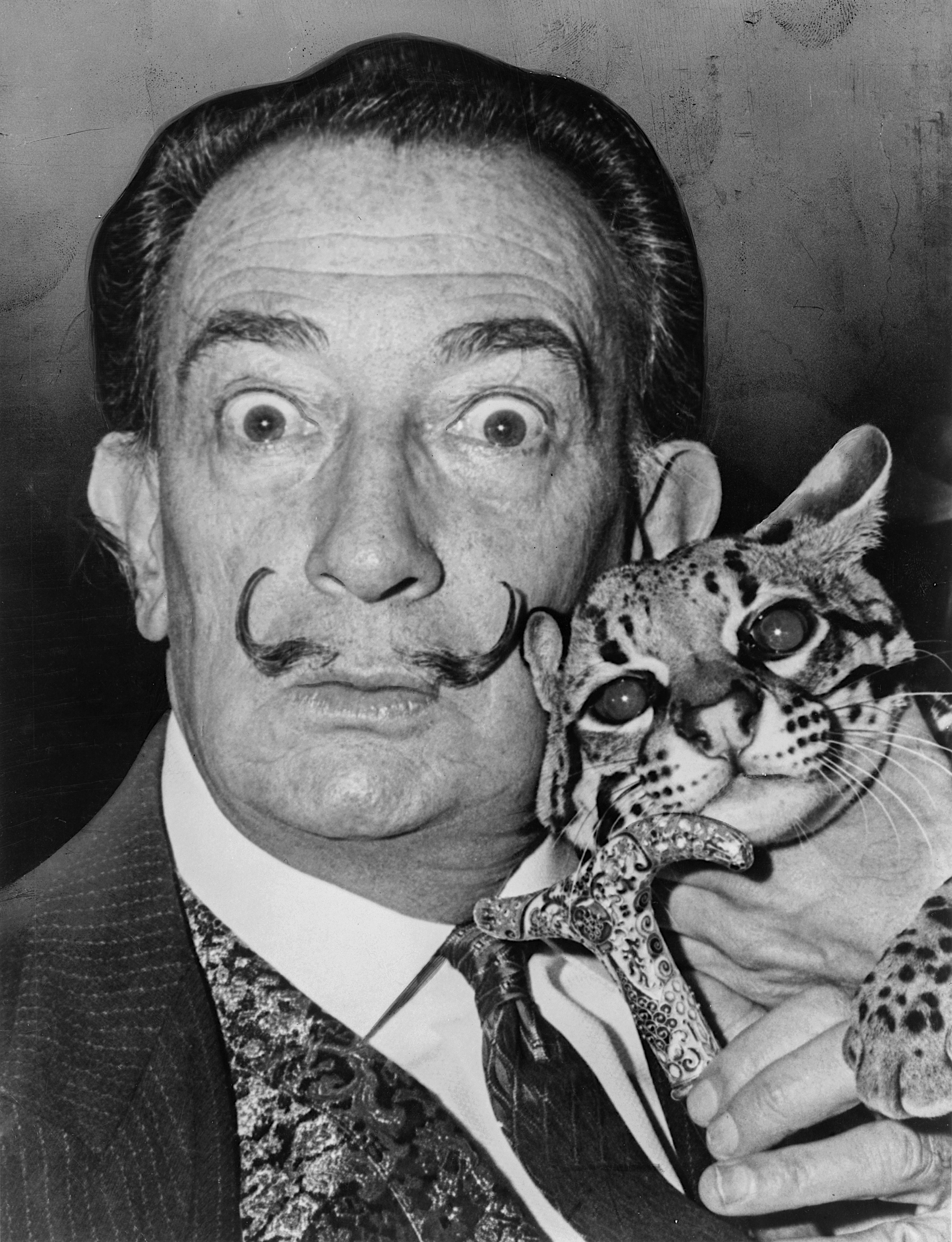
Salvador Dalí with his pet ocelot Babou
