= National Natural History Museum (Bolivia) =

Natural history museum in Bolivia

- Museo Nacional de Historia Natural
- Established: December 19, 1980
- Location: Calle 26, La Paz, Bolivia
- Coordinates: 16°32′19.60″S 68°4′14.40″W
- Type: Public
- Architect: Teresa Gisbert
- Website: mnhn.gob.bo

The National Natural History Museum (Spanish: Museo Nacional de Historia Natural) is a natural history museum located in La Paz, Bolivia. It was established in 1980 with the aim of contributing to the country's scientific and cultural development, and creating a center for recreation and support for formal education in the fields of natural sciences and natural history. It is affiliated with the Higher University of San Andrés.

== History ==
This museum was inaugurated on December 19, 1980 by the National Academy of Sciences of Bolivia, in the city of La Paz. The building was designed by Bolivian architect Teresa Gisbert. The first director was Humberto Gandarillas.
