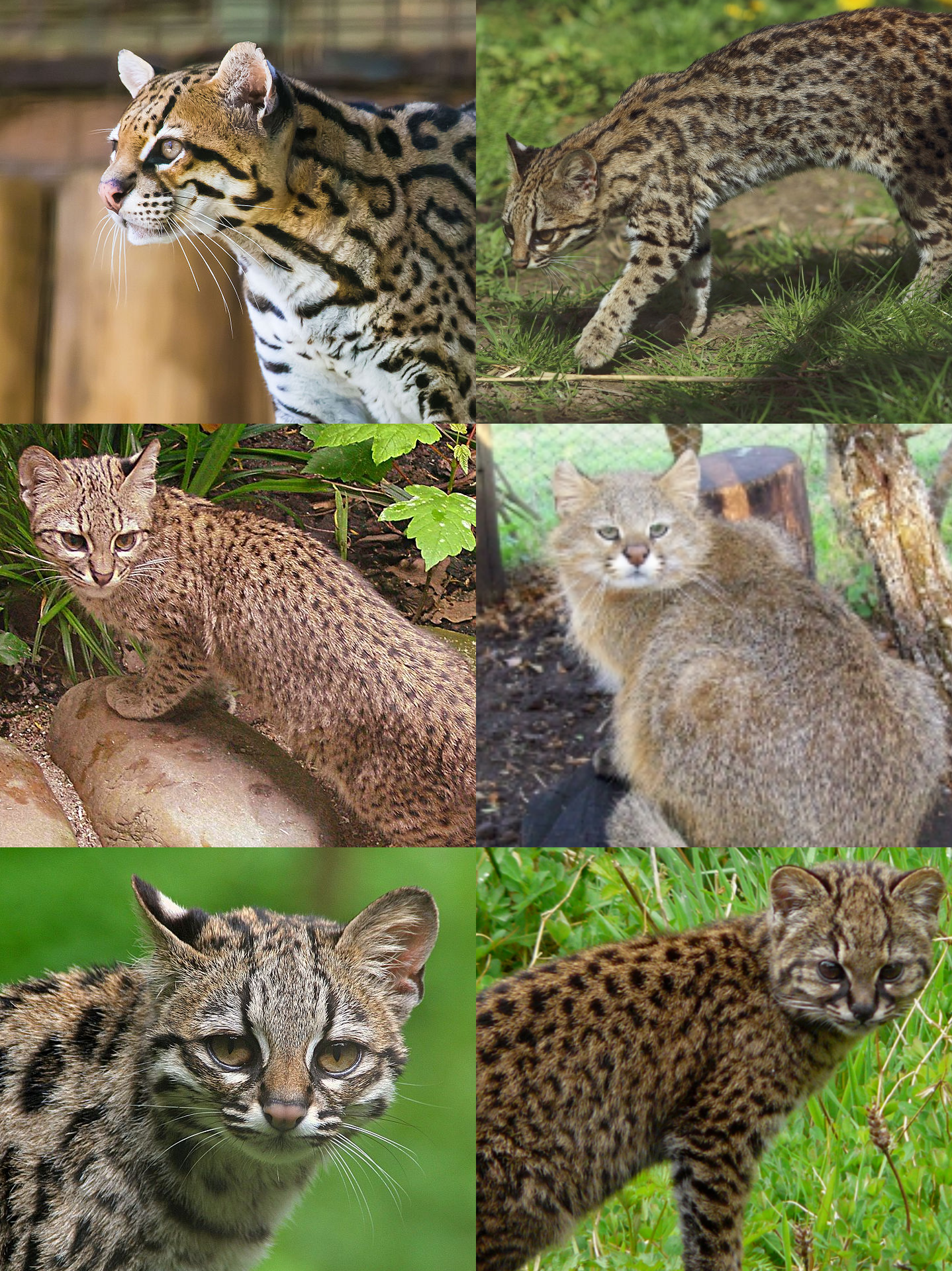
- Leopardus species from top-left, clockwise: ocelot (L. pardalis), oncilla (L. tigrinus), Pampas cat (L. colocola), kodkod (L. guigna), margay (L. wiedii), Geoffroy's cat (L. geoffroyi)

Scientific classification
- Kingdom: Animalia
- Phylum: Chordata
- Class: Mammalia
- Order: Carnivora
- Family: Felidae
- Subfamily: Felinae
- Genus: Leopardus; Gray, 1842

Type species
- Leopardus griseus Gray, 1842
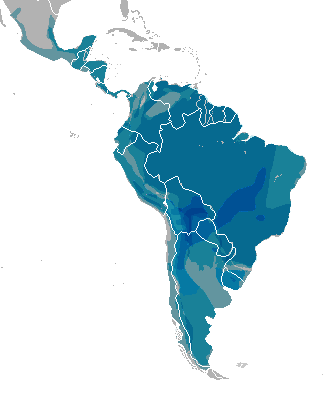
- Leopardus distribution

= Leopardus =

Leopardus Temporal range: Pleistocene-Recent ~2.5–0 Ma

Genus of felines native to the Americas

Leopardus is a genus of small cats native to the Americas. This genus is considered the oldest branch of a genetic lineage of small cats in the Americas whose common ancestor crossed the Bering land bridge from Asia to North America in the late Miocene.

== Characteristics ==
Leopardus species have spotted fur, with ground colors ranging from pale buff, ochre, fulvous and tawny to light gray. Their small ears are rounded and white-spotted; their rhinarium is prominent and naked above, and their nostrils are widely separated. They have 36 chromosomes, whereas other felids have 38.

== Taxonomy ==
The generic name Leopardus was proposed by John Edward Gray in 1842, when he described two spotted cat skins from Central America and two from India in the collection of the Natural History Museum, London. Several genera were proposed in the 19th and early 20th centuries for small spotted cats in the Americas, including:

- Dendrailurus, Lynchailurus, Noctifelis, Oncifelis and Oncoïdes by Nikolai Severtzov in 1858;
- Margay, Pajeros, Pardalina and Pardalis by Gray in 1867;
- Oncilla by Joel Asaph Allen in 1919;
- Oreailurus by Ángel Cabrera in 1940;
- Colocolo by Reginald Innes Pocock in 1941.

Analysis of skull morphology of these taxa revealed close similarities in their base of skulls and nasal bones, their masticatory muscles, and dentition. Phylogenetic analysis of tissue samples of these taxa and their ability to hybridise support the notion that they are members of the same genus. The following eight extant Leopardus species have been recognized as valid taxa by the IUCN since 2017:

Genus Leopardus – Gray, 1842 – eleven species
Common name	Scientific name and subspecies	Range	IUCN status and estimated population
Ocelot	Leopardus pardalis (Linnaeus, 1758) Two subspecies: L. p. mitis (Cuvier, 1820); L. p. pardalis (Linnaeus, 1758)	southwestern United States to northern Argentina	LC
Pampas cat	Leopardus colocola (Molina, 1782) Seven subspecies: L. c. colocola (Molina, 1782); L. c. pajeros (Desmarest, 1816); L. c. braccatus (Cope, 1889); L. c. garleppi (Matschie, 1912); L. c. budini (Pocock, 1941); L. c. munoai (Ximénez, 1961); L. c. wolffsohni (Garcia-Perea, 1994)	Argentina and Uruguay into the Gran Chaco and Cerrado of Bolivia, Paraguay and Brazil, and north through the Andes mountain chain through Ecuador and possibly marginally into southwestern Colombia	NT
Kodkod	Leopardus guigna (Molina, 1782) Two subspecies: L. g. guigna (Molina, 1782); L. g. tigrillo (Schinz, 1844)	Chile	LC 26,383–101,294
Margay	Leopardus wiedii (Schinz, 1821) Three subspecies: L. w. wiedii (Schinz, 1821); L. w. vigens (Thomas, 1904); L. w. glauculus (Thomas, 1903)	Mexico through Central America to Brazil and Paraguay.	NT
Geoffroy's cat	Leopardus geoffroyi (d'Orbigny & Gervais, 1844) Five subspecies: L. g. geoffroyi; L. g. euxantha; L. g. leucobapta; L. g. paraguae; L. g. salinarum	Argentina, Bolivia, Brazil, Chile, Paraguay and Uruguay.	LC
Andean mountain cat	Leopardus jacobita (Cornalia, 1865)	Argentina, Chile, Bolivia and central Peru.	EN 2,177
Tiger cats. The IUCN currently recognises two species, but the MDD recognises five.
Oncilla	Leopardus tigrinus (Schreber, 1775)	Costa Rica and Panama, and throughout the Amazon basin to central Brazil.	VU 8,932–10,208
Southern tigrina	L. guttulus (Hensel, 1872)	Brazil (Minas Gerais and Goiás states), eastern Paraguay and northeastern Argentina	VU 6,047
Clouded tiger cat	L. pardinoides Gray, 1867	Costa Rica and Panama, and through the Andes mountains to northwestern Argentina.	Not classified Unknown
Nariño cat	L. narinensis Ruiz-García et al., 2023	southern Colombia	Not classified Unknown
Tilcayo	L. tilcayo Nogales-Ascarrunz, Aliaga-Rossel, Lescroart & Eizirik, 2026	Bolivia	Not classified Unknown

In 2017 and 2021, results of genetic analyses revealed a third tigrina-like species, Leopardus emiliae.

A 2021 analysis of 142 pampas cat museum specimens collected across South America showed significant morphological differences between them. Therefore, it was proposed to split the historically contentious pampas cat species complex into five species: Leopardus colocolo, Leopardus braccatus, Leopardus garleppi, Leopardus munoai, and Leopardus pajeros. Later that same year, it was noted that the oldest available name for pampas cats of the Uruguayan savannah region was Leopardus fasciatus, not L. munoai.

Another new species, Leopardus narinensis was described in 2023, based on a single dried skin collected in 1989 on the Galeras Volcano in the Nariño Department of Colombia. It differs from all other Leopardus species both morphologically and genetically.

In 2024, a detailed analysis of both the morphology and genetics of specimens assigned to Leopardus tigrinus, Leopardus guttulus, and Leopardus emiliae suggested L. t. pardinoides should be elevated to species status as Leopardus pardinoides due to significant differences in morphology, genetics, and ecology. The subspecies L. t. oncilla was assigned to be a subspecies of L. pardinoides as L. p. oncilla. Additionally, genetic analysis suggested that L. emiliae was not genetically distinct from L. tigrinus, and thus may be invalid. The study recommended the common names savannah tiger-cat for L. tigrinus, Atlantic Forest tiger-cat for L. guttulus, and clouded tiger-cat for L. pardinoides.

In 2026, a cat found in Bolivia was described as a new species, Leopardus tilcayo. The IUCN has yet to formally recognize this species.

An expanded list of Leopardus species would be:

- Leopardus braccatus, the Pantanal cat or Brazilian pampas cat
- Leopardus colocola, the colocolo or Central Chilean pampas cat
- Leopardus emiliae, the eastern tigrina or Snethlage's tigrina
- Leopardus fasciatus, Muñoa's pampas cat or Uruguayan pampas cat
- Leopardus garleppi, the northern pampas cat or Garlepp's pampas cat
- Leopardus geoffroyi, Geoffroy's cat
- Leopardus guigna, the kodkod
- Leopardus guttulus, the southern tigrina or Atlantic Forest tiger-cat
- Leopardus jacobita, the Andean mountain cat
- Leopardus pajeros, the southern pampas cat
- Leopardus pardalis, the ocelot
- Leopardus pardinoides, the clouded tiger cat
- Leopardus tigrinus, the oncilla, northern tigrina, or savannah tiger-cat
- Leopardus weidii, the margay
- Leopardus narinensis, the Nariño cat, Galeras cat, or red tigrina
- Leopardus tilcayo, the tilcayo

=== Phylogeny ===
Phylogenetic analysis of the nuclear DNA in tissue samples from all Felidae species revealed that the evolutionary radiation of the Felidae began in Asia in the Miocene around 14.45 to 8.38 million years ago. Analysis of mitochondrial DNA of all Felidae species indicates a radiation at around 16.76 to 6.46 million years ago.

The last common ancestor of Leopardus, Puma and Lynx is estimated to have lived 10.95 to 6.3 million years ago, based on analysis of nuclear DNA of cat species. Analysis of their mitochondrial DNA indicates that their last common ancestor lived 14.04 to 6.83 million years ago. Leopardus forms an evolutionary lineage that genetically diverged between 4.25 to 2.02 million years ago and 5.19 to 0.98 million years ago. It crossed the Isthmus of Panama probably during the Great American Biotic Interchange in the late Pliocene. Leopardus vorohuensis is an extinct species of the genus, of which fossils were found in the Argentinian Vorohué Formation dated to the early Pleistocene; its supraorbital foramen and shape of teeth resemble those of the pampas cat.

Within the genus, three distinct clades were identified: one comprising the ocelot and the margay, a second the Andean mountain cat and Pampas cat, and the third the kodkod, oncilla and Geoffroy's cat. The following cladogram shows estimated divergence times in million years ago (mya).

Phylogenetic relationships of living Leopardus species as derived through analysis of

nuclear DNA:

- Felidae
  - Felinae
    - Leopardus 4.25–2.02 mya
      - 1.48–0.56 mya
        - 1.21–0.41 mya
          - Kodkod
          - Geoffroy's cat
        - - Oncilla
      - 3.56–1.68 mya
        - 2.41–1.01 mya
          - Margay
          - Ocelot
        - 2.70–1.18 mya
          - Pampas cat
          - Andean mountain cat
    - other Felinae lineages
  - Pantherinae

mitochondrial DNA:

- Felidae
  - Felinae
    - Leopardus 5.19–0.98 mya
      - 4.91–0.64 mya
        - 4.71–0.26 mya
          - 4.17–0.02 mya
            - South American oncilla
            - Pampas cat
          - Andean mountain cat
        - 4.76–0.05 mya
          - Ocelot
          - Margay
      - 4.85–0.35 mya
        - 4.64–0.04 mya
          - Geoffroy's cat
          - Kodkod
        - Central American oncilla
    - other Felinae lineages
  - Pantherinae

More recent studies have indicated splitting the oncillas (tigrinas) into multiple species, and that they are paraphyletic to the Geoffroy’s cat and guigna (kodkod). The Andean cat L. jacobi was found to be related to the margay. The general grouping of three clades continues to be retrieved from analyses. Lescroart et al. (2023) proposed three subgenera: Leopardus (ocelot, margay, and Andean cat, type L. pardalis), Lynchailurus (Pampas cats, type L. colocola), and Oncifelis (tigrinas, guigna, and Geoffroy’s, type L. geoffroyi).
