= Leopardus guttulus =

Southern tigrina

Conservation status
- Vulnerable (IUCN 3.1)
- CITES Appendix I

Scientific classification
- Kingdom: Animalia
- Phylum: Chordata
- Class: Mammalia
- Order: Carnivora
- Family: Felidae
- Genus: Leopardus
- Species: L. guttulus

Binomial name
- Leopardus guttulus (Hensel, 1872)
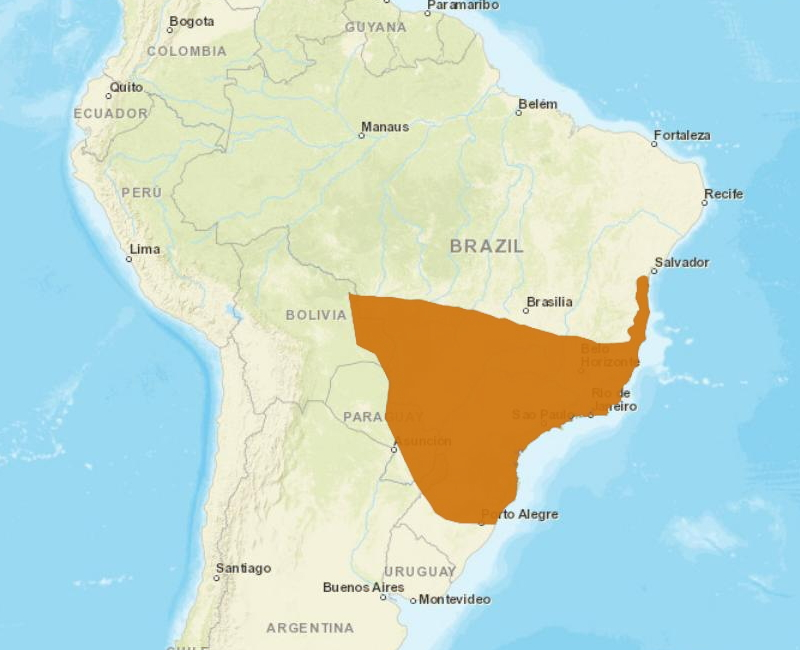
- Distribution of the southern tigrina, 2016

Small wild cat

Leopardus guttulus, the southern tigrina or southern tiger cat, is a small wild cat species native to Brazil, Argentina and Paraguay.

== Taxonomy ==
Felis guttula was the scientific name used in 1872 by Reinhold Hensel when he described a tiger cat from the jungles of the Rio Grande do Sul in southern Brazil.

It was long considered to be a subspecies of the oncilla (Leopardus tigrinus). It was recognized as a distinct species in 2013.

It is closely related to Geoffroy's cat (L. geoffroyi), with which it reportedly interbreeds in southern Brazil.

== Characteristics ==
The southern tigrina has a yellowish-ochre coat, patterned with open black rosettes. It is slightly darker than the oncilla, has a larger rosette pattern, and a slightly shorter tail. However, it is extremely difficult to distinguish between the two species by appearance alone, since more genetic variation tends to occur within each species, than between the two species. An adult southern tigrina weighs between 1.9 and 2.4 kg (4.2 and 5.3 lb).

== Distribution and habitat ==
The southern tigrina occurs from central to southern Brazil in Minas Gerais and Goiás states, in the Atlantic forest, eastern Paraguay and northeastern Argentina below elevations of 2,000 m (6,600 ft). The population is roughly estimated to comprise around 6,000 mature individuals. It inhabits dense tropical and subtropical rainforests, deciduous and mixed pine forests, open savannahs, and beach vegetation.

At the margins of its range, the southern tigrina interbreeds with Geoffroy's cat, but it does not appear to interbreed with the oncilla population in northeastern Brazil, which in contrast has a history of interbreeding with the pampas cat L. colocolo. Because of habitat differentiation, interbreeding does not occur between oncilla and southern tigrina. In contrast, hybridization and introgression occurs between southern tigrina and Geoffroy's cat at their contact zone in southern Brazil. Many southern tigrina and Geoffrey's cats are thought to be partial hybrids, because of the high level of interbreeding that is occurring.

== Behaviour and ecology ==
The southern tigrina preys mostly on small mammals, birds and lizards. Average prey weighs less than 100 g (0.22 lb), but also includes larger sized prey up to 1 kg (2.2 lb).

The southern tigrina often inhabits the same habitat as the ocelot. In areas with a high ocelot concentration, the southern tigrina populations are smaller, due to competition. When ocelots are scarce, it allows for smaller cat species, such as the southern tigrina, to have better opportunities for shelters, food, and territory, which therefore allows for a larger population size and density of southern tigrina. This phenomenon is called the ocelot effect.

In 2015, two juvenile southern tigrinas were recorded for the first time in the Atlantic forest while learning hunting skills and capturing a cavy. The mother plays an important role in teaching her cubs how to hunt and survive in the wild.

== Threats ==
During the fur trade, the southern tigrina was heavily exploited. Today, the biggest threats to the southern tigrina include habitat loss and deforestation, hunting by local people, road kills, diseases spread from domestic dogs, and the use of rodent poisoning.

== Conservation ==
The southern tigrina occurs in protected areas, but probably at low densities. Currently, a push is on to better understand the ecology, evolution, and genetics of the southern tigrina to orchestrate a more effective conservation strategy for the species. In addition, further research is being conducted to better understand the special differences between oncilla and southern tigrina. Hunting of this species is banned in Argentina, Brazil, and Paraguay.

== Evolution ==
A demographic expansion following the Last Glacial Maximum (20,000 years ago) is thought to have led to the allopatric speciation of the southern tigrina.
