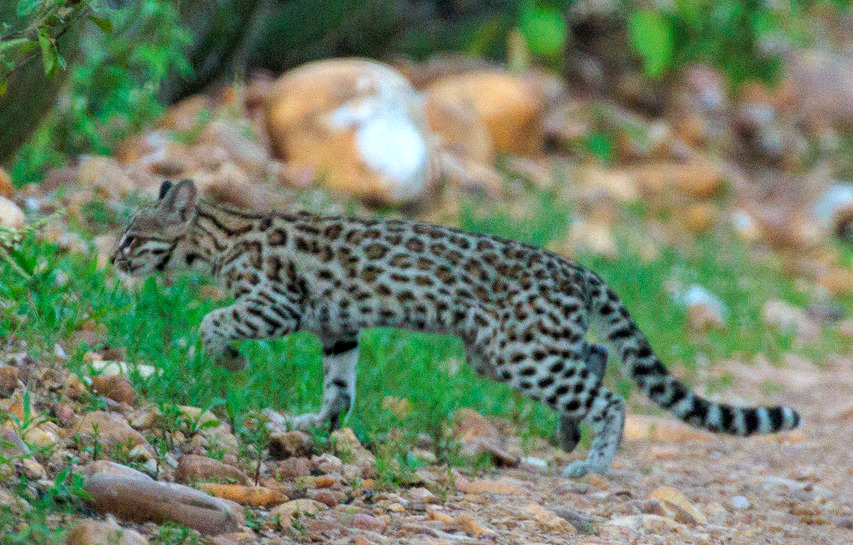

Conservation status
- Vulnerable (IUCN 3.1)
- CITES Appendix I

Scientific classification
- Kingdom: Animalia
- Phylum: Chordata
- Class: Mammalia
- Order: Carnivora
- Family: Felidae
- Genus: Leopardus
- Species: L. tigrinus

Binomial name
- Leopardus tigrinus (Schreber, 1775)
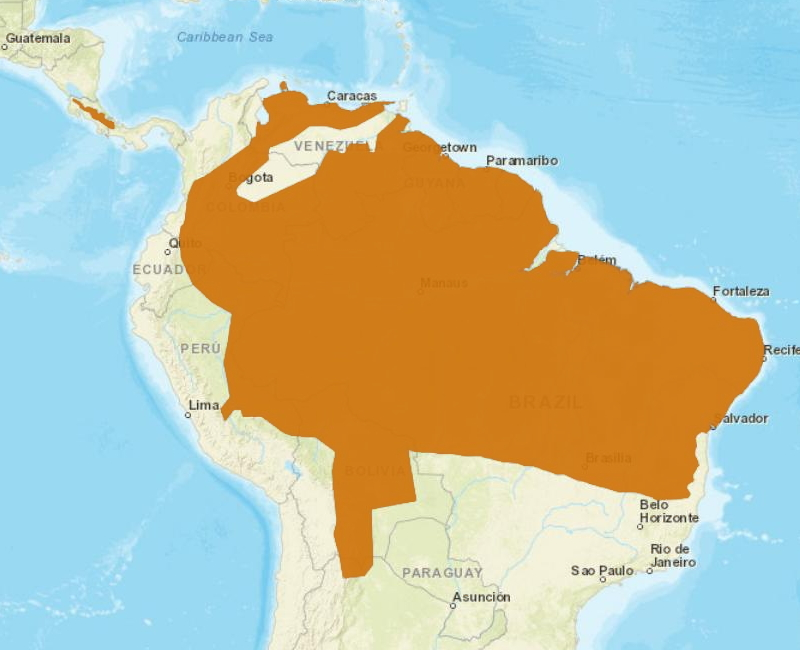
- Distribution of the oncilla, 2016

Synonyms
- Oncifelis tigrinus; Felis tigrina

= Oncilla =

Small wild cat

The oncilla (Leopardus tigrinus), also known as the northern tiger cat, little spotted cat, and tigrillo, is a small spotted cat ranging from Central America to central Brazil. It is listed as Vulnerable on the IUCN Red List, and the population is threatened by deforestation and conversion of habitat to agricultural land.

In 2013, it was proposed to assign the oncilla populations in southern Brazil, Paraguay, and Argentina to a new species, the southern tiger cat (L. guttulus), after it was found that it does not interbreed with the oncilla population in northeastern Brazil. In 2017, following the results of a morphological analysis of 250 skin and skull specimens, the recognition of a distinct species—the eastern tiger cat (L. emiliae)—was proposed. In 2024, a similar argument was put forth with regards to the Andean montane cloud forest sub-population; for a new species to be recognized, now known as the clouded tiger cat (L. pardinoides). In 2026, a genetic analysis of Leopardus species in South America proposed that the L. tigrinus complex comprised five species, adding the tilcayo (L. tilcayo).

== Characteristics ==
The oncilla resembles the margay (L. wiedii) and the ocelot (L. pardalis), but it is smaller, with a slender build and narrower muzzle. Oncillas are one of the smallest wild cats in South America, reaching a body length of 38 to 59 cm (15 to 23 in) with a 20 to 42 cm (7.9 to 16.5 in) long tail. While this is somewhat longer than the average domestic cat, the oncilla is generally lighter, weighing 1.5 to 3 kg (3.3 to 6.6 lb).

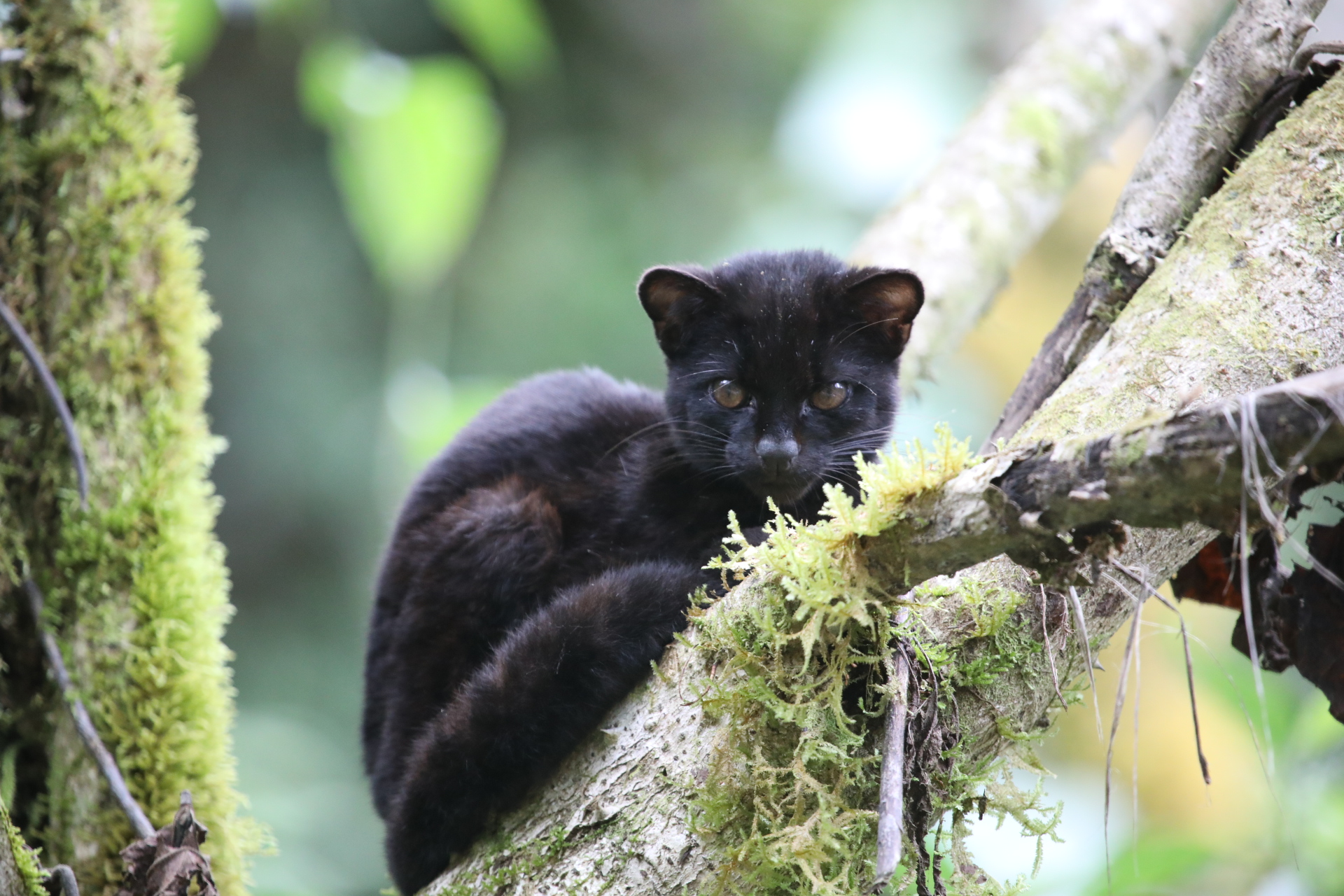
A melanistic oncilla in a tree in Cerro de la Muerte, Costa Rica

The fur is thick and soft, ranging from light brown to dark ochre, with numerous dark rosettes across the back and flanks. The underside is pale with dark spots and the tail is ringed. The backs of the ears are black with bold white spots. The rosettes are black or brown, open in the center, and irregularly shaped. The legs have medium-sized spots tapering to smaller spots near the paws. This coloration helps the oncilla blend in with the mottled sunlight of the tropical forest understory. The oncilla's jaw is shortened, with fewer teeth, but with well-developed carnassials and canines.

Some melanistic oncillas have been reported from the more heavily forested parts of its range.

== Distribution and habitat ==
The oncilla is distributed from a disjunct population in Costa Rica and Panama, and throughout the Amazon basin to central Brazil. It was recorded in Costa Rica's cloud forests, in the northern Andes at elevations of 1,500 to 3,000 m (4,900 to 9,800 ft) and in dry Cerrado and Caatinga landscapes of northern Brazil. In Panama, it was recorded in Darién, and in Volcán Barú National Parks. In Colombia, it was recorded in the Cordillera Occidental at elevations of 1,900 to 4,800 m (6,200 to 15,700 ft) in Los Nevados National Natural Park, and in Antioquia Department.

== Ecology and behavior ==
Dead oncilla with ruler for scale, in northern Brazil

The oncilla is a primarily terrestrial animal, but also an adept climber. It is an obligate carnivore that hunts rodents, lizards, birds, eggs, invertebrates, and occasionally also tree frogs. It stalks its prey from a distance, and once in range, it pounces to catch and kill the prey. Most oncillas are nocturnal, but in the Brazilian Caatinga – where diurnal lizards are their main food source – they are active during daylight. Young oncillas have been observed to purr; adults are known to make short, gurgling calls when close to one another.

Oncilla calls

=== Reproduction ===
Estrus lasts from three to nine days, with older cats having shorter cycles. Females give birth to one to three kittens after a gestation of 74–76 days. The kittens' eyes open after 8–17 days, an unusually long period for a cat of this size. Their teeth erupt more or less simultaneously at around 21 days of age. The kittens do not begin to take solid food until they are 38–56 days old, but are fully weaned by the age 90 days.

Oncillas reach sexual maturity around the age of 2–2.5 years. They have a life span of about 11 years in the wild, but there are records of captive oncillas reaching age 17 years.

== Taxonomy ==
The following are the traditionally recognized subspecies:

- Leopardus tigrinus tigrinus, eastern Venezuela, Guyana, northeastern Brazil; the nominate subspecies
- Leopardus tigrinus guttulus, Atlantic forest central and southern Brazil, Uruguay, Paraguay, northern Argentina (later recognised as a separate species, the southern tiger cat)
- Leopardus tigrinus oncilla, Central America
- Leopardus tigrinus pardinoides, western Venezuela, Colombia, Ecuador, Peru; the clouded tiger cat

Although the Central American oncilla is listed as a separate subspecies, based on analysis of mitochondrial DNA, Johnson et al. (1999) found strongly supported differences between L. t. oncilla in Costa Rica and L. t. guttulus in southern Brazil, comparable to differences between different neotropical species. Researchers have argued that there should be a splitting of the oncilla into two species, as there is a pronounced difference in appearance between the oncillas in Costa Rica and those in central and southern Brazil. Further samples of L. t. oncilla are needed from northern South America to determine whether this taxon ranges outside Central America, and whether it should be considered a distinct species rather than a subspecies.

In 2013, genetic research revealed that the former subspecies L. t. guttulus is a separate cryptic species that does not interbreed with the other subspecies, and proposes a classification into two species, the L. guttulus and L. tigrinus.

A zone of hybridization between the oncilla and the colocola (Pampas cat) has been found through genetic analyses of specimens from central Brazil.

Results of a morphological analysis of 250 samples of skins and skulls indicate that there are three distinct oncilla groups: namely one in South America's northern, north-western and western range countries, one in eastern and one in southern range countries. Based on these results, it was proposed in 2017 that the eastern group constitutes a distinct species, L. emiliae. A further phylogenetic study published in 2021 supported the recognition of a third species.

In their 2026 description of the tilcayo (L. tilcayo), Lescroart and colleagues recognized L. guttulus (southern), L. pardinoides (clouded), and L. emiliae (eastern) as species distinct from L. tigrinus. They further named a new subspecies of L. tigrinus, L. t. antisuyo, the Antisuyo tiger cat. The name Guiana tiger cat was used in reference to L. t. tigrinus.

== Threats ==
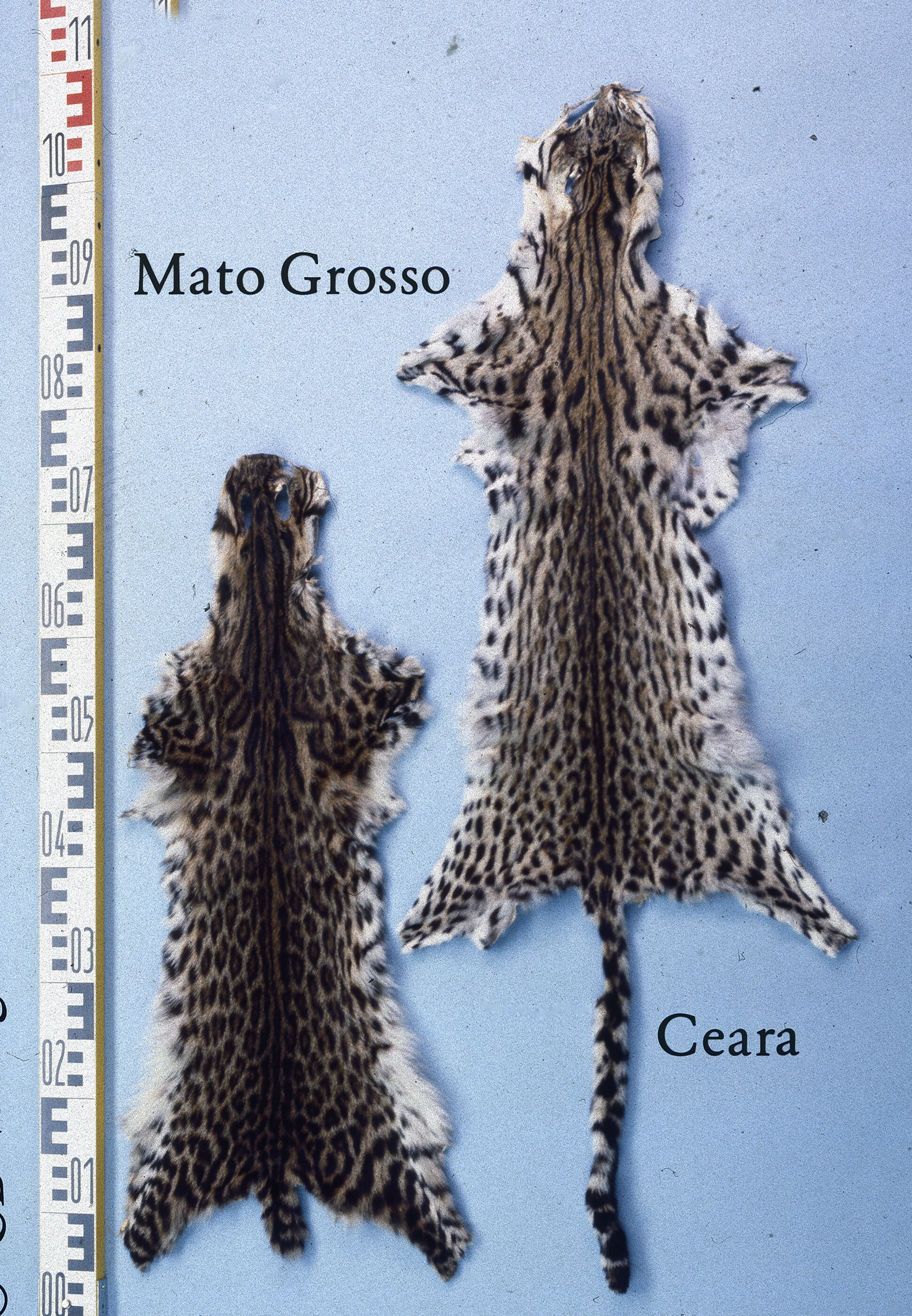
Oncillas are killed for their fur.

The oncilla is mainly threatened by deforestation and poaching. Oncillas are killed for their pelts, which are highly prized and often sold or made into clothing. Reports in 1972 and 1982 in South America showed that the oncilla is one of the four most heavily hunted of all the small wild cats.

Another factor contributing to oncilla mortality is human expansion and conversion of land for settlements. Coffee plantations are most often established in cloud forest habitats, causing the reduction of preferred habitats.

Hybridization of the oncilla with the Geoffroy's cat (Leopardus geoffroyi) has been found in the southernmost part of its range; hybridization with the Pampas cat (L. colocola) has also been found in central Brazil. Such hybridization may be a natural process, and the extent of it as a threat to the oncilla is unknown.

== Conservation ==
The oncilla has been classified as Vulnerable on the IUCN Red List. It is listed on CITES Appendix I, prohibiting all international commercial trade in oncillas or products made from them. Hunting is still allowed in Ecuador, Guyana, Nicaragua and Peru.
