= Pantanal (disambiguation) =

The Pantanal is a tropical wetland area in Brazil, Bolivia and Paraguay.

Pantanal may also refer to:

- Arena Pantanal, a football stadium in Brazil
- Pantanal cat, a species of wild cat
- Pantanal (1990 TV series), a 1990 Brazilian telenovela
- Pantanal (2022 TV series), a 2022 Brazilian telenovela
- Pantanal Futebol Clube, a Brazilian football team
- Pantanal Linhas Aéreas, a Brazilian airline
- Pantanal do Rio Negro State Park, state park in Brazil
- Pantanal Matogrossense National Park, national park in Brazil
- Troller Pantanal, an off-road pickup truck
- TV Pantanal, a defunct television station in Cáceres, Mato Grosso, Brazil
- TV Pantanal (Cuiabá), a television station in Cuiabá, Mato Grosso, Brazil
