= Porto (disambiguation) =

Porto (from Latin portus, harbour, alternatively Oporto) may refer to a number of people, places, things may also refer to:

== Wine ==
- Port wine (especially from Portugal)

== Places ==
=== Angola ===
- Porto Amboim

=== Brazil ===
- Porto Seguro
- Porto Velho
- Porto Ferreira
- Porto Alegre
  - Grêmio Foot-Ball Porto Alegrense, its football club
- Porto Feliz
- Clube Atlético do Porto, a football club

=== Benin ===
- Porto-Novo

=== France ===
- Porto-Vecchio, a municipality of the Corse-du-Sud department, Corsica
- Porto (Corsica), small village on the west coast of the island, near the Calanques de Piana, Corsica

=== Greece ===
- Porto Carras
- Porto Cheli

=== Italy ===
- Porto (Italy), a port at the Tiber mouth and suburbicarian bishopric
- Porto, Castiglione del Lago, a frazione of Castiglione del Lago, Perugia
- Porto, a locality in the comune of Galzignano Terme, in the Province of Padua, Veneto

==== Municipalities ====
- Porto Azzurro, in the Province of Livorno, Tuscany
- Porto Mantovano, in the Province of Mantua, Lombardy
- Porto Tolle, in the Province of Rovigo, Veneto
- Porto Torres, in the Province of Sassari, Sardinia
- Porto Valtravaglia, in the Province of Varese, Lombardy
- Porto Venere, in the Province of La Spezia, Liguria
- Porto Viro, in the Province of Rovigo, Veneto
- Portocannone, in the Province of Campobasso, Molise
- Portoferraio, in the Province of Livorno, Tuscany
- Loiri Porto San Paolo, in the Province of Olbia-Tempio, Sardinia

==== Hamlets ====
- Porto Cervo, in the municipality of Arzachena (OT), Sardinia
- Porto d'Ascoli, in the municipality of San Benedetto del Tronto (AP), Marche
- Porto Ercole, in the municipality of Monte Argentario (GR), Tuscany
- Porto Ottiolu, in the municipality of Budoni (OT), Sardinia
- Porto Potenza Picena, a civil parish of Potenza Picena (MC), in the Marche
- Porto Santo Stefano, municipal seat of Monte Argentario (GR), Tuscany

=== Portugal ===
==== Continental Portugal ====
- Porto
  - Futebol Clube do Porto, a football club based in the city
  - Grande Porto, a.k.a. Grande Área Metropolitana do Porto
  - Porto District
  - Porto Metro
  - Porto Vivo
- Portalegre
- Porto Covo
- Salir do Porto

==== Madeira ====
- Porto Santo Island
- Porto Moniz

==== Azores ====
- Vila do Porto

=== Spain ===
- Porto de Sanabria

== People ==
- Porto (surname)

== Arts and entertainment ==
- Porto (film), 2015
- "Porto", a 2010 song by Brant Bjork from Gods & Goddesses
- "Porto", 2014 song by Worakls
- "Porto", 2021 song and single by Spekti
- Porto, a villain in Power Rangers: Turbo

== Media ==
- TV Porto, a television station in Porto Seguro, Bahia, Brazil
- TV Porto (Porto dos Gaúchos), a television station in Porto dos Gaúchos, Mato Grosso, Brazil
- Porto Canal, a Portuguese television channel

== Other ==
- Oporto (restaurant), an Australian restaurant chain
- Oporto (grape), an alternative name for the German wine grape Blauer Portugieser
  - Blaufränkisch, Austrian wine grape that is also known as Oporto
- Oporto (Madrid Metro), a station on Line 5 and 6

== See also ==
- Portus (disambiguation)
