= Porto (surname) =

Porto is a surname. Notable people with the surname include:

- Al Porto (1926–2005), Major League Baseball pitcher
- Alex Porto (born 1986), Brazilian football player
- Avelino Porto (1935–2024), Argentine lawyer and the founder of the University of Belgrano in Buenos Aires
- Carlo Porto (born 1981), actor and Brazilian model
- Fernanda Porto (born 1965), Brazilian drum 'n' bossa singer
- Georges de Porto-Riche (1849–1930), French dramatist and novelist
- James V. Porto, physicist at the National Institute of Standards and Technology
- José Porto (born 1933), a Portuguese rower
- Kiko Porto (born 2003), Brazilian racing driver
- Giovanni Lo Porto (1977–2015), Italian aid worker
- Leonardo Porto (born 1986), Brazilian football coach
- Luigi Da Porto (1485–1529), Italian writer and storiographer
- Manuela Porto (1908–1950), Portuguese actor, writer, journalist, theatre critic, translator and campaigner for women's rights
- Rosa Porto (1930–2019), Cuban-American baker and businesswoman
- Sasckya Porto, Brazilian playmate
- Silva Porto (explorer) (1817-1890), António Francisco Ferreira da Silva Porto, Portuguese trader and explorer
- Silva Porto (painter) (1850-1893), António Carvalho da Silva, Portuguese naturalist painter
- Sérgio Pereira da Silva Porto (1926–1979), Brazilian physicist
- Sérgio Porto (1923–1968), Brazilian columnist, writer, broadcaster and composer
- Severiano Mário Porto (1930–2020), Brazilian architect
- Vanessa Porto (born 1984), Brazilian mixed martial artist
- Viviane Porto (born 1981), Brazilian actress and former dancer

== See also ==
- Portis (disambiguation)
- Porta (surname)
- Porto (disambiguation)
