= Dalla Porta =

Dalla Porta is an Italian surname. Notable people with the surname include:

- Celeste Dalla Porta (born 1997), Italian actress
- Lorenzo Dalla Porta (born 1997), Italian motorcycle racer

== See also ==
- La Porta
- Porta (surname)
