= TV Pantanal (Cuiabá) =

- Cuiabá, Mato Grosso; Brazil
- City: Cuiabá
- Channels: Digital: 21 (UHF); Virtual: 22

Programming
- Affiliations: RedeTV!

Ownership
- Owner: Grupo Gazeta de Comunicação; (TV Vila Real Ltda.)
- Sister stations: TV Vila Real

History
- First air date: November 10, 2007
- Former channel numbers: Analog: 21 (UHF, 2007–2018)
- Former affiliations: TV Aparecida (2007–2014)

Technical information
- Licensing authority: ANATEL

Links
- Public license information: Profile
- Website: www.tvpantanalcba.com.br

TV Pantanal (channel 22) is a RedeTV!-affiliated television station licensed to Cuiabá, capital of the state of Mato Grosso. The station is owned by Grupo Gazeta de Comunicação, making it a sister station to TV Vila Real, a Record affiliate.

== History ==
=== License ===
The license was granted on October 26, 1997, in the city of Cuiabá, in the name of Mauro Uchaki and Irinéia Moraes Silva, employees of Klauk family companies. This family had already founded, five years ago, a broadcaster of the same name in the city of Cáceres (also named TV Pantanal), in the south of the state. The initiative seemed to be to form a network, however, at no point until around 2010 did the Cuiabano channel become operational.

In 2002, presenter and businessman Gugu Liberato became the owner of TV Pantanal, also shared by Vera Lúcia Klauk, wife of Elvis Klauk who owned the Cacerense channel, however, the then minister of communications, Juarez Quadros, annulled the broadcaster's concession, as the concession contract was declared illegal by the Legal Consultancy of the Ministry of Communications. Broadcasting legislation only allows the sale of TV concessions after five years of operation of the station, and Gugu had purchased Pantanal from the former partners before the station began operating.

Last year, the presenter and his sister "returned" the company to its former partners, officially withdrawing from the partnership. This withdrawal was received by broadcasting executives simply as a strategy by the presenter to get the concession back, because he had already invested a lot in the channel. When the concession was cancelled, the building and the TV transmission tower had already been built and the broadcaster already had a retransmission license.

In 2004, the family of former federal deputee Pedro Henry (PP) had acquired TV Pantanal of Cáceres from the Klauks. This was followed by the use of the station as "electoral platforms", impeachments by the Public Ministry and, later, in 2008, the suspension of its transmission. The Cacerense channel even tried to return to the air in 2011, but was suspended again two years later.

In 2007, Gugu finally obtained the concession for the station in Cuiabá. He and his sister, Aparecida Liberato Caetano, officially owned 49.99%, and Vera Klauk was the majority.

=== TV Aparecida (2007–2014) ===
In that negotiation, the then-famous "TV do Gugu" started transmitting its first signals. In the same year, the station started relaying Catholic network TV Aparecida from São Paulo. It relayed the network, with no local programming.

With the changes in affiliation taking place in June that year in Cuiabá - TV Cidade Verde Cuiabá joined Rede Bandeirantes and TV Rondon joined SBT -, TV Pantanal expected to become the new RedeTV! affiliate in Cuiabá, however the station opted to join TV Cuiabá, which, in turn, left Record News.

Before 2013 ended, TV Pantanal de Cuiabá was acquired by businessman Aldo Locatelli. Three years earlier, the businessman tried to make this purchase together with the then senator elected by Pedro Taques (PDT) and fellow businessman Mauro Mendes.

=== RedeTV! (since 2014) ===
In February 2014, TV Pantanal stopped relaying Rede Aparecida to now effectively carry the RedeTV signal! in Cuiabá. In this change, there were integrations of some more programs in the house, such as ShopFácilTV, presented by Getúlio Peçanha, formerly of TV Rondon, and Pantanal Notícias, a news program that sporadically featured some reports made by the station's then new journalism team.

=== From Grupo Locatelli to Grupo Gazeta ===
In 2016, it was discovered that there was interest from Dorileo Leal, from Grupo Gazeta de Comunicação (which includes RecordTV Cuiabá) in purchasing TV Pantanal. In March, the first attempt was made, without success. However, in September, Dorileo concluded negotiations with the Locatelli group that culminated in this purchase. As a result, all of the station's programs were cancelled, and all employees were fired, meaning there was no regional programming until April 2017. The following month, the VIP Program appeared on the channel. The program led by Eduardo Carvalho, who had been on RecordTV Cuiabá for 14 years, was relocated to TV Pantanal.

The new directorate restored an old program, Opinião, now presented by Antero Paes de Barros, and with Haroldo Arruda Jr. and Lourembergue Alves. Igor Taques, the former presenter, was hired by TV Cidade Verde.

== Tecchnical information ==
Subchannels of TV Pantanal
Channel	Res.	Content
22.1	1080i	TV Pantanal / RedeTV!'s programming

The digital signal switched on in 2013 and the analog signal shut down on August 14, 2018, when Cuiabá turned off its analog signals.

== Programming ==
- Alerta Cuiabá, political news
- Pantanal News, news during breaks
- ClassiTV, time-brokered classifieds program
- Elga e Você, variety
