= Portis =

Portis may refer to:

== People ==
- Alan M. Portis (1926–2010), American physicist
- Ben Portis (1960–2017), Canadian artist
- Bobby Portis (born 1995), American basketball player
- Charles Portis (1933–2020), American author
- Clinton Portis (born 1981), American football player
- John Wesley Portis (1818–1902), Confederate colonel
- Josh Portis (born 1987), American football player
- Larry Portis (1943–2011), American historian
- Stoney Portis was a US Army lieutenant-colonel who served in the Afghanistan War

== Other uses ==
- Portis, Kansas, United States
- PORTIS/SPORTIS (Portable Ticket Issuing System), a ticketing system introduced by British Rail

== See also ==
- Portishead (disambiguation)
