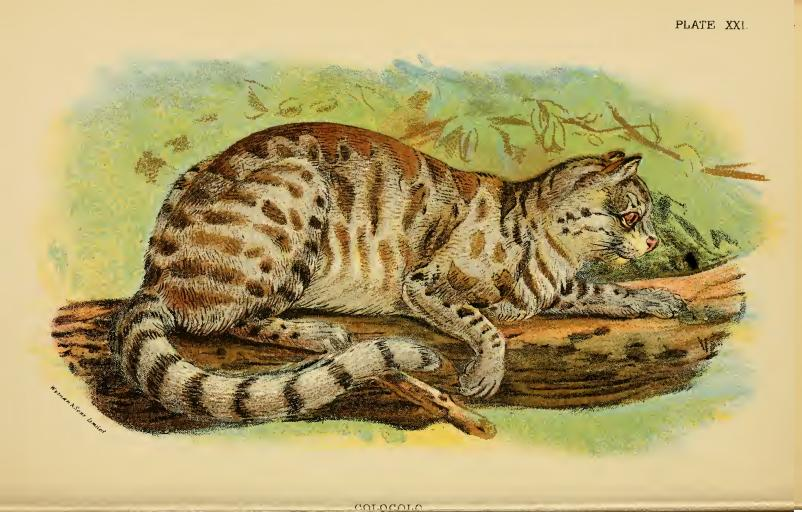
- Pampas cat with the third pelage type

Conservation status
- Near Threatened (IUCN 3.1)
- CITES Appendix II

Scientific classification
- Kingdom: Animalia
- Phylum: Chordata
- Class: Mammalia
- Order: Carnivora
- Family: Felidae
- Genus: Leopardus
- Species: L. colocola

Binomial name
- Leopardus colocola (Molina, 1782)

Subspecies
- L. c. colocola (Molina, 1782); L. c. pajeros (Desmarest, 1816); L. c. braccatus (Cope, 1889); L. c. garleppi (Matschie, 1912); L. c. budini (Pocock, 1941); L. c. munoai (Ximénez, 1961); L. c. wolffsohni (Garcia-Perea, 1994)
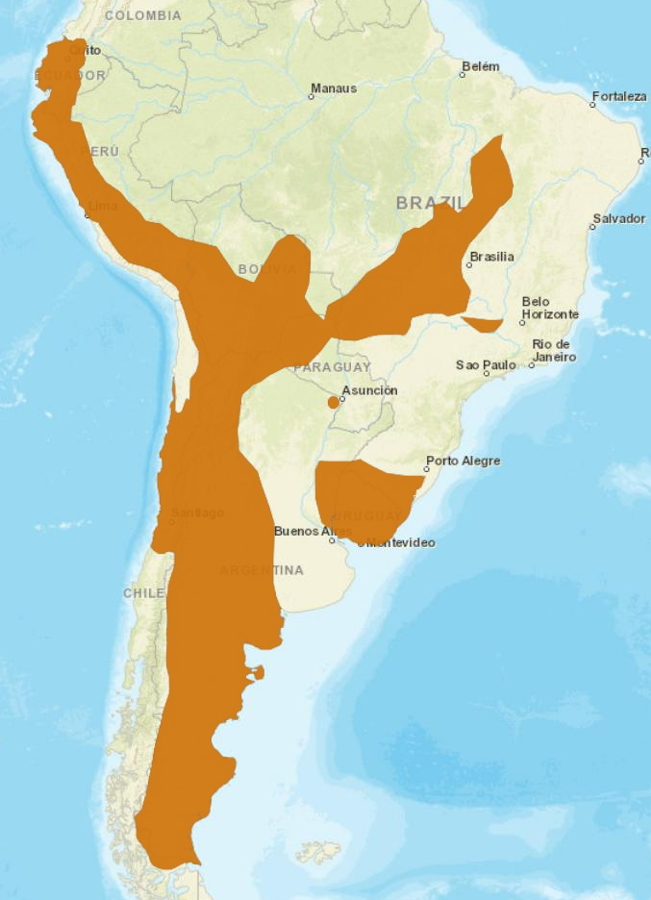
- Distribution of the Pampas cat, 2016

= Pampas cat =

Small wild cat species

The Pampas cat (Leopardus colocola) is a small wild cat native to South America. It is listed as Near Threatened on the IUCN Red List as habitat conversion and destruction may cause the population to decline in the future.

It is named after the Pampas, but occurs in grassland, shrubland, and dry forest at elevations up to 5,000 m (16,000 ft).

There was a proposal to divide the Pampas cat into three distinct species, based primarily on differences in pelage colour/pattern and cranial measurements. Accordingly, three species were recognised in the 2005 edition of Mammal Species of the World: the colocolo (L. colocolo), the Pantanal cat (L. braccatus), and the Pampas cat (L. pajeros) with a more restricted definition. This split at species level was not supported by subsequent phylogeographic analysis, although some geographical substructure was recognised, and some authorities continue to recognise the Pampas cat as a single species. In the 2017 revision of felid taxonomy by the Cat Specialist Group, the Pampas cat is recognized as a single species with seven subspecies. An analysis of 142 skins collected across South America revealed morphological differences between these museum specimens. It was therefore proposed to recognize five distinct species within the Pampas cat complex.

== Characteristics ==
The Pampas cat is a little bigger than a domestic cat and has a bushier tail. Its size varies between regions, ranging in body length from 46 to 75 cm (18 to 30 in) with a 23–29 cm (9.1–11.4 in) long tail. Six variants of its pelage occur, but all have two dark lines on the cheeks:

- Type 1. Reddish or dark grey with rusty-cinnamon stripes on the flanks, a cinnamon upper side of the ears with black edges and tips, four or five reddish rings on the tail (outer two are darker), dark brown stripes on the legs, black chest spots, and whitish underparts with rusty-ochraceous stripes. This type occurs in central Chile in subtropical, xerophytic forests at altitudes of up to 1,800 m (5,900 ft).
- Type 2A. Flanks with large, reddish-brown, rosette-shaped spots with darker borders, numerous rings on the tail (of the same colour as the flank spots), and very dark brown, almost black stripes on the legs with spots or stripes on the underparts. This type occurs in the northern Andes in the subspecies L. c. thomasi and L. c. wolffsohni.
- Type 2B resembles Type 2A, but the background colour is paler, and the body markings, stripes on the hind legs, and rings on the tail are paler and less distinct.
- Type 2C is overall greyish with distinct dark brown stripes on the legs and spots on the underparts, a plain tail (no clear rings), and at most indistinct dark lines on the flanks.
- Type 3A is almost entirely rusty-brown with faint spots, continuous bands, an unbanded tail with a prominent black tip, and all-black feet. This pattern is found in the subspecies L. c. braccatus.
- Type 3B is similar to type 3A, but the background color is paler and more yellowish, with flank spots that are browner and more distinct, feet that are only black on the soles, and discontinuous rings and a narrow black tip on the tail. This type occurs in the subspecies L. c. munoai.

The subtypes of Type 2 show variation according to altitude and latitude. Only the first subtype occurs in the north (around 20°S and northwards), and only the third type occurs in the far south (around 40°S and southwards). In between, the majority are of second subtype, but the first subtype has been recorded as far south as 29°S, and the third subtype as far north as 36°S. At latitudes where both the first and second subtypes occur, the former tends to live in highlands and the latter in lowlands.

A melanistic phenotype is caused by the addition of a single cysteine residue at position 120 of Agouti-signaling protein. This disrupts the four disulphide bonds in the normal protein, altering its tertiary structure and reducing its ability to bind to the melanocortin 1 receptor.

== Taxonomy ==
Felis colocola was the scientific name proposed by Juan Ignacio Molina in 1782 for a cat from Chile. The subgenus Lynchailurus was proposed in 1851 by Nikolai Severtzov for Felis pajeros Desmarest.

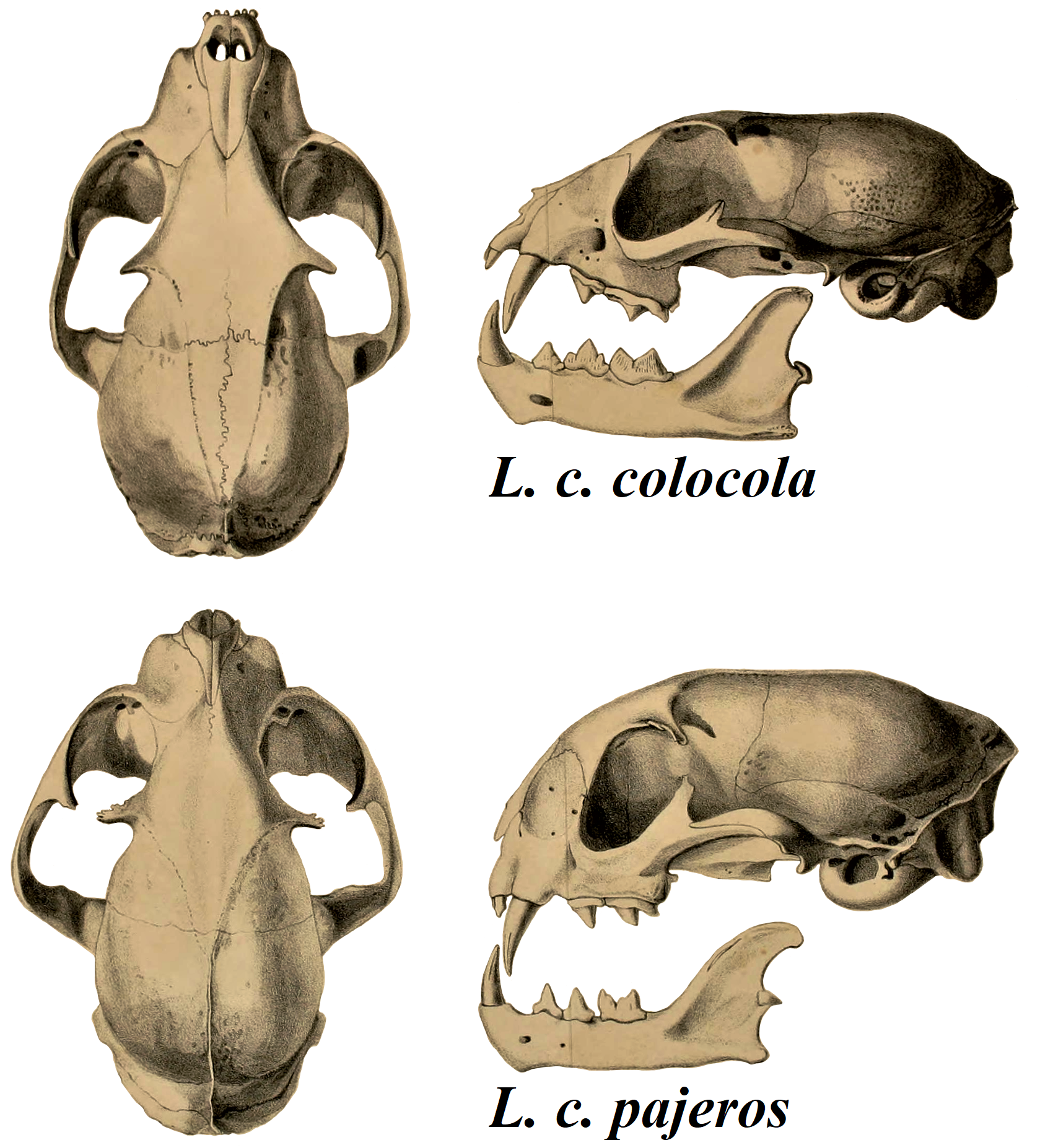
Skulls

An extensive morphological analysis of Pampas cat specimens from across the species's range revealed differences in cranial measurements, and pelage colour and pattern. Therefore, the Pampas cat group was divided into three distinct species with 11 subspecies. This species division was recognised in the 2005 edition of Mammal Species of the World, although the number of subspecies was reduced:

- Leopardus colocola (colocolo)
  - L. c. colocola – subtropical forests of central Chile
  - L. c. wolffsohni (Garcia-Perea, 1994) – in spiny shrublands and páramo of northern Chile
- Leopardus braccatus (Pantanal cat)
  - L. b. braccatus (Cope, 1889) – central Brazil, eastern Paraguay, extreme eastern Bolivia, and parts of north-eastern Argentina.
  - L. b. munoai (Ximenez, 1961) – Rio Grande do Sul in Brazil, and Uruguay.
- Leopardus pajeros (Pampas cat, with a more restricted definition)
  - L. p. pajeros (Desmarest, 1816), the Nominate subspecies – southern Chile and widely in Argentina
  - L. p. crespoi – eastern slope of the Andes in northwestern Argentina
  - L. p. garleppi (Matschie, 1912) – Andes in Peru
  - L. p. steinbachi – Andes in Bolivia
  - L. p. thomasi – Andes in Ecuador

Based on just two specimens, the subspecies L. p. steinbachi is larger and paler than L. p. garleppi. However, this is labelled with uncertainty due to the very small sample, and some treat it as a synonym of L. p. garleppi. Uncertainty also exists for the subspecies L. p. budini, which appears to resemble L. p. crespoi, and was described from lowlands of northwestern Argentina, but may actually be from humid forests in the region. Some recognise it, while others do not. Populations in southern Chile and the southern part of Argentina, included in the nominate in the above list, were recognised as the subspecies L. p. crucinus based on its dull pelage and large size.

More recent work, primarily genetic studies, failed to find support for a split at species level, although some geographical substructure was recognized. Several authors recognise the Pampas cat as a single species. Since 2017, the Cat Classification Taskforce of the Cat Specialist Group recognises the Pampas cat as a single species with seven subspecies:

- L. c. colocola
- L. c. pajeros
- L. c. braccatus
- L. c. garleppi
- L. c. budini (Pocock, 1941)
- L. c. munoai
- L. c. wolffsohni

Authors of a study published in May 2020 found significant morphological, molecular, geographic, and ecological differences between various Pampas cat populations across South America. They propose five monotypic species within the Pampas cat species complex, namely L. colocola, L. braccatus, L. garleppi, L. munoai and L. pajeros. The Pampas Cat Working Group recognises these five species for the purposes of their conservation projects. In 2022, the name L. munoai was stated to be a junior synonym of L. fasciatus, and the proposed species should be called by the latter name.

Genomic sequencing and molecular phylogeny studies indicate that the pampas cats (sensu lato) form one of three clades within Leopardus. In 2023 it was proposed to use subgenus Lynchailurus for the pampas cat group, alongside Oncifelis and the nominate Leopardus, for the other two.

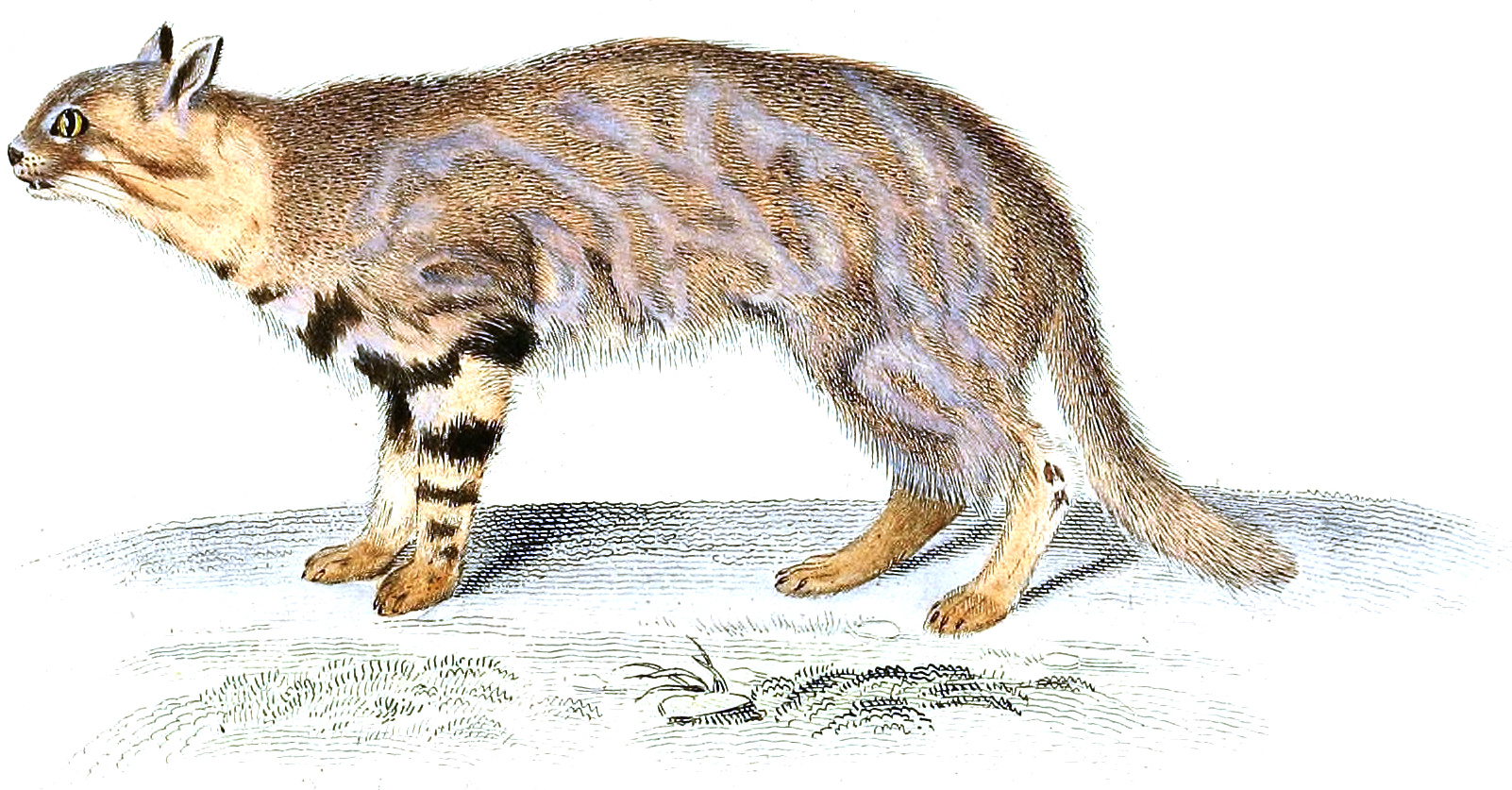
L. c. pajeros. Illustration by Jean-Gabriel Prêtre (1844)

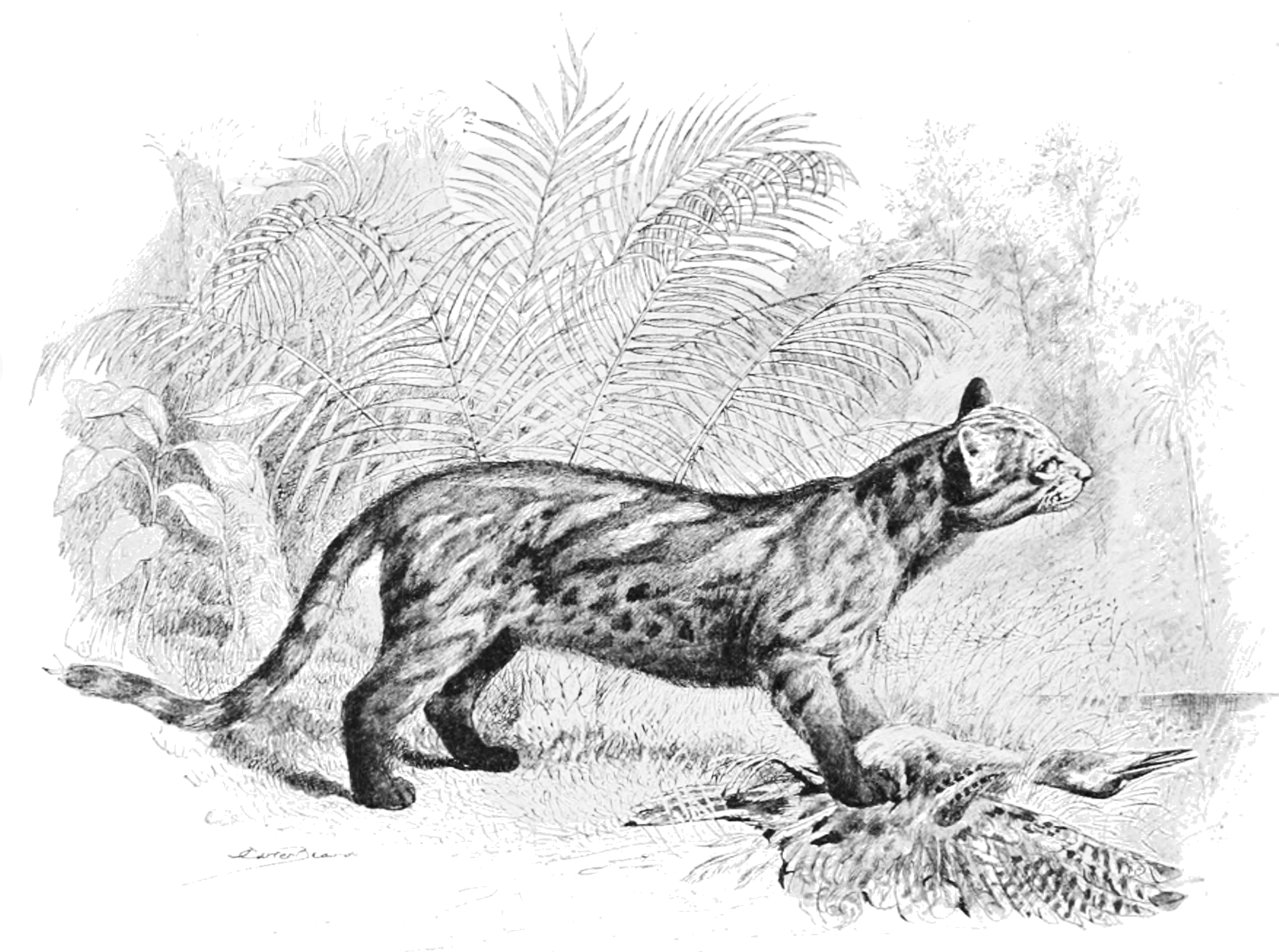
L. c. braccatus. Illustration (1897)

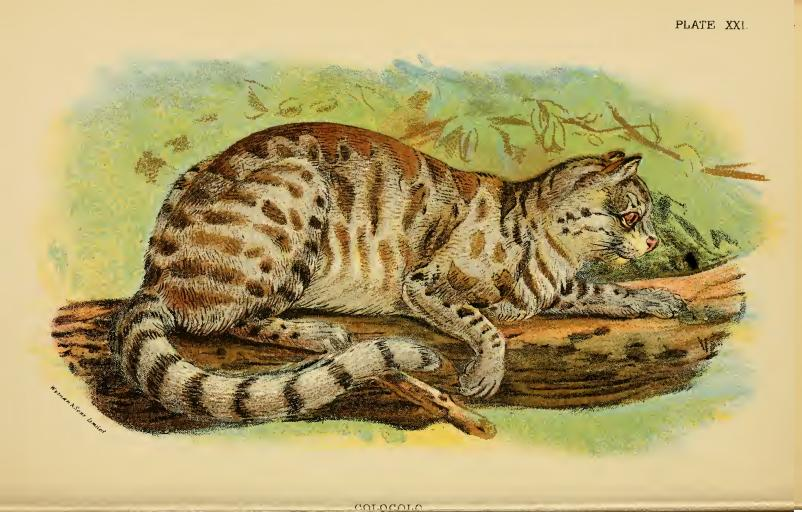
L. c. colocola. Illustration (1896)

== Distribution and habitat ==
The Pampas cat ranges throughout most of Argentina and Uruguay into the Gran Chaco and Cerrado of Bolivia, Paraguay and Brazil, and north through the Andes mountain chain through Ecuador and possibly marginally into southwestern Colombia. It occurs in a wide range of habitats and inhabits elevations between 1,800 and 5,000 m (5,900 and 16,400 ft) in páramo, marginally also in puna grassland and locally in dry forest. Where its range overlaps with the Andean mountain cat in northwestern Argentina, it occurs at lower elevations on average. In central to northwestern Argentina, the Pampas cat is found at elevations below 1,240 m (4,070 ft) in grassland, mesophytic and dry forest, and shrubland. In southern Argentina and far southern Chile, it is found in Patagonian steppes and shrubland at altitudes below 1,100 m (3,600 ft).

In 2016, it was recorded for the first time in the Sechura Desert and in the dry forest of northwestern Peru.

== Ecology and behaviour ==
Little is known about the Pampas cat's hunting and breeding habits. It is thought to prey mainly on small mammals and birds. Guinea pigs are thought to form a large part of its diet, along with viscachas, other rodents, and the ground-dwelling tinamou order of birds. Though some have suggested it is chiefly nocturnal, others suggest it is mainly diurnal.

Litters are relatively small, usually consisting of only one or two kittens, and occasionally three. The kittens weigh around 130 g (4.6 oz) at birth. The average lifespan is nine years, but some have lived for over 16 years.
