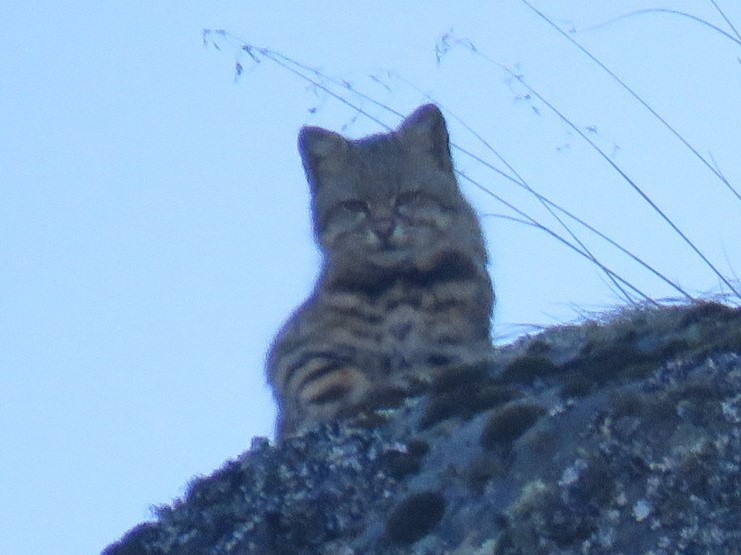

Scientific classification
- Kingdom: Animalia
- Phylum: Chordata
- Class: Mammalia
- Order: Carnivora
- Family: Felidae
- Genus: Leopardus
- Species: L. colocola
- Subspecies: L. c. garleppi

Trinomial name
- Leopardus colocola garleppi (Matschie, 1912)
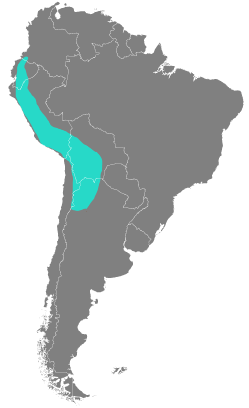

Synonyms
- synonyms of L. garleppi: Felis (Lynchailurus) pajeros garleppi Matschie, 1912; Felis pajeros thomasi Lönnberg, 1913; Felis pajeros garleppi Lönnberg, 1913; Lynchailurus pajeros thomasi Allen, 1919; Lynchailurus pajeros garleppi Allen, 1919; Felis (Lynchailurus) colocolo garleppi Pearson, 1951; Lynchaylurus pajeros pajeros Yepes, 1936; Lynchailurus colocolus garleppi Cabrera, 1940; Lynchailurus colocolus thomasi Cabrera, 1940; Lynchailurus pajeros budini Pocock, 1941; Lynchailurus pajeros steinbachi Pocock, 1941; Felis (Lynchailurus) colocolo crespoi Cabrera, 1957; Felis (Lynchailurus) colocolo budini Cabrera, 1958; Felis (Lynchailurus) colocolo crespoi Cabrera, 1958; Felis (Lynchailurus) colocolo thomasi Cabrera, 1958; Felis colocola budini Ximénez, 1961; Felis colocola crespoi Ximénez, 1961; Felis colocola garleppi Ximénez, 1961; Felis colocola thomasi Ximénez, 1961; Lynchailurus colocolo wolffsohni García-Perea, 1994; Lynchailurus pajeros budini García-Perea, 1994; Lynchailurus pajeros crespoi García-Perea, 1994; Lynchailurus pajeros garleppi García-Perea, 1994; Lynchailurus pajeros steinbachi García-Perea, 1994; Lynchailurus pajeros thomasi García-Perea, 1994; Leopardus colocolo wolffsohni Wozencraft, 2005; Leopardus pajeros budini Wozencraft, 2005; Leopardus pajeros garleppi Wozencraft, 2005; Leopardus pajeros steinbachi Wozencraft, 2005; Leopardus pajeros thomasi Wozencraft, 2005

= Garlepp's pampas cat =

Garlepp's Pampas Cat

Subspecies of mammal

Garlepp's pampas cat (Leopardus colocola garleppi), also called the northern pampas cat, is a subspecies of the pampas cat. It has more recently been classified as a full species (Leopardus garleppi) within a pampas cat species complex. Garlepp's pampas cat is native to the central-western mountainous area of South America.

== Characteristics ==
Leopardus garleppi is a small wild cat with a brownish-grey forehead, orange speckles on the nape and crown, a dark brownish-grey stripe on the spine with some orange hairs sprinkled in, pale brownish-grey or yellowish-brown background color on the body with obvious rosettes of reddish-brown with an orangish-brown interior, and reddish-brown rings on the tail.

== Distribution and habitat ==
Garlepp's pampas cat lives in the Andes Mountains from Colombia to northwestern Argentina and northern Chile.
