= Estádio Arthur Marinho =

Stadium in Corumbá, Brazil

Coordinates: 19°00′10″S 57°39′52″W

- Estádio Arthur Marinho
- Interactive map of Estádio Arthur Marinho
- Full name: Estádio Arthur Marinho
- Location: Corumbá, Mato Grosso do Sul, Brazil
- Capacity: 2,400
- Surface: Grass

Construction
- Opened: July 4, 1941

Tenant
- Pantanal Futebol Clube

Estádio Arthur Marinho is a stadium in Corumbá, Brazil. It has a capacity of 2,400 spectators. It is the home of Pantanal Futebol Clube.
