= TV Porto (Porto dos Gaúchos) =

- Porto dos Gaúchos, Mato Grosso; Brazil
- Channels: Analog: 13; Digital: 28 (UHF, to be implemented)
- Branding: TV Porto

Programming
- Affiliations: Record

Ownership
- Owner: TV Porto dos Gaúchos

History
- First air date: July 25, 2011

TV Porto (channel 13) is a Brazilian television station serving as the affiliate of the Record television network for the city of Porto dos Gaúchos, in the state of Mato Grosso. The station is a Legal Amazon retransmitter, specifically of TV Vila Real from Cuiabá.

== History ==
TV Porto was founded on July 7, 2011 and launched on July 25, 2011, from a rented house at the Guilherme Maia avenue, serving as its first headquarters. The station produced Porto Notícias from the start, initially presented by Ray Hanauer. The station's first

The station received a round of applause on August 1, 2022, for its eleventh anniversary, for its service to the city.

On June 3, 2024, TV Porto premiered a new set and Porto Notícias became the local edition of Balanço Geral, in line with other Record relayers. The local edition added the Roleta da Sorte competition.

In January 2026, the TV station will switch from analog to digital.
