= Porta =

Porta may refer to:

== People ==
- Porta (rapper) (born 1988), stagename of Christian Jiménez Bundo, a Spanish rap singer
- Porta (surname)

== Places ==
- La Porta, a commune in the Haute-Corse department of France on the island of Corsica
- Porta (Barcelona), a neighbourhood of Barcelona, Spain
- Porta, Pyrénées-Orientales, a commune in the Pyrénées-Orientales department in southern France
- Porta, Thessaly, a pass and settlement in Thessaly, central Greece
- Porta, Xanthi, a district of Xanthi in Thrace, northeastern Greece
- Porta, the Hungarian name for Poarta village, Bran Commune, Braşov County, Romania
- Porta del Sol, a tourism region in western Puerto Rico
- Porta Littoria, the name applied from 1939 to 1946 for the town of La Thuile in the Valle d’Aosta, Italy
- Porta Westfalica in Germany
- Porta Nigra in Trier, Germany

== Convents ==
- Porta Coeli (Moravia), in the Czech Republic, a convent from 1239 after which an asteroid is named
- Porta Coeli (Puerto Rico), in San Germán, Puerto Rico

== Railway stations ==
- Porta Alpina, a proposed railway station to be built in the middle of the Gotthard Base Tunnel in southern Switzerland
- Porta Nuova, Turin, a railway station in Turin, northern Italy
- Verona Porta Nuova railway station, in Verona, northern Italy
- Porta Susa, a railway station in Turin, northern Italy
- "Porta Gia Ton Ourano", a song recorded by Greek pop singer Elena Paparizou

== City gates ==
- Porta Appia, a gate in the third-century Aurelian Walls of Rome, now known as the Porta San Sebastiano
- Porta Asinaria, a gate in the third-century Aurelian Walls of Rome
- Porta Borsari, a Roman gate in Verona, northern Italy
- Porta Capena, a gate in the Servian Wall near the Caelian Hill, in Rome
- Porta Capuana, an ancient city gate in Naples, southern Italy
- Porta Collina, a gate at the north end of the Servian Wall of Rome
- Porta de Santiago, a small gate house and the only remaining part of the A Famosa fortress in Malacca, Malaysia
- Porta Decumana, the back gate of a Roman castrum
- Porta Esquilina, a gate in the Servian Wall of Rome
- Porta Flaminia, a gate in the third-century Aurelian Walls of Rome
- Porta Latina, a gate in the third-century Aurelian Walls of Rome
- Porta Leoni, an ancient Roman gate in Verona, northern Italy
- Porta Liviana, a medieval gate in the walls of Padua, Italy
- Porta Maggiore, or Porta Prenestina, a gate in the third-century Aurelian Walls of Rome
- Porta Nigra, in Trier, Germany
- Porta Nomentana, a gate in the third-century Aurelian Walls of Rome
- Porta Ognissanti (Padua), a gate in the walls of Padua
- Porta Ostiensis, a gate in the third-century Aurelian Walls of Rome
- Porta Pia, a gate in the third-century Aurelian Walls of Rome
- Porta Pinciana, a gate in the third-century Aurelian Walls of Rome
- Porta Portese, a gate in the seventeenth-century Janiculum Walls of Rome
- Porta Portuensis (or Porta Maggiore), a gate in the third-century Aurelian Walls of Rome
- Porta Praenestina (or Porta Maggiore), a gate in the third-century Aurelian Walls of Rome
- Porta Prenestina (or Porta Maggiore), a gate in the third-century Aurelian Walls of Rome
- Porta San Giovanni (Padua), a gate in the walls of Padua
- Porta Salaria, a gate in the third-century Aurelian Walls of Rome
- Porta San Giovanni (Rome), a gate in the third-century Aurelian Walls of Rome
- Porta San Giovanni (San Gimignano), a gate in the walls of San Gimignano
- Porta San Giovanni (Padua), a gate in the walls of Padua
- Porta San Lorenzo, the ancient Porta Tiburtina, a gate in the third-century Aurelian Walls of Rome
- Porta Palatina in Turin, Italy
- Porta San Pancrazio, a gate in the Janiculum district of Rome
- Porta San Paolo, a gate in the third-century Aurelian Walls of Rome
- Porta San Sebastiano, the ancient Porta Appia, a gate in the third-century Aurelian Walls of Rome
- Porta Santa Croce (Padua), a gate in the walls of Padua
- Porta Savonarola (Padua), a gate in the walls of Padua
- Porta Settimiana, a gate in the third-century Aurelian Walls of Rome
- Porta Tiburtina, a gate in the third-century Aurelian Walls of Rome
- Porta Trigemina, a gate in the fourth-century Servian Wall of Rome
- Porta del Popolo, once the Porta Flaminia, a gate in the fourth-century Servian Wall of Rome

== Other ==
- Porta, a mobile GSM carrier of Ecuador owned by América Móvil
- Porta, the main brand of beer engine manufacturer Porter Lancastrian
- Porta a Porta, an Italian television talk show
- Porta-bote, a small, portable, foldable boat
- Porta cath, or port, or portacath, a small medical appliance installed beneath the skin
- Porta classroom, a temporary building installed on the grounds of a school to provide additional classroom space
- Porta-Color, a portable color television
- Porta della Pescheria, the north portal of the Cathedral of Modena
- Porta hepatis, or transverse fissure of the liver
- Porta Hotel Antigua, a hotel in Antigua
- Porta Hungarica, the Devín Gate or Hainburger Gate, a natural gate in the Danube valley at the border of Slovakia and Austria
- Porta-ledge, a deployable hanging tent system designed for rock climbers
- Porta Obscura, an album by German gothic metal band Coronatus
- Porta potty, a portable toilet
- Porta Prima Augustus, a 2.04m high marble statue of Augustus Caesar
- Porta Westfalica (gorge), in North Rhine-Westphalia, Germany
- Portakabin, an English trade name for a kind of portable building
- PortaPuTTY, a terminal emulator application
- Porta, a common misspelling of Kodak Portra film

== See also ==
- Portanova (disambiguation)
- Portia (disambiguation)
