= TV Educativa da Bahia =

TVE Bahia (ZYA299)

Salvador, Bahia; Brazil
- Channels: Digital: 24 (UHF); Virtual: 10
- Branding: TVE Bahia

Programming
- Affiliations: TV Brasil

Ownership
- Owner: IRDEB; (Instituto de Radiodifusão Educativa da Bahia - IRDEB)
- Sister stations: TV Kirimurê; Educadora FM

History
- First air date: November 9, 1985
- Former channel numbers: Analog: 2 (VHF, 1985–2017)
- Former affiliations: TVE Brasil (1985-2007); TV Cultura (1993-2009); Canal Futura (2020-2023)

Technical information
- Licensing authority: ANATEL
- ERP: 6 kW
- Transmitter coordinates: 12°59′49.8″S 38°29′58.4″W

Links
- Public license information: Profile
- Website: irdeb.ba.gov.br/tveonline

TV Bahia (channel 10) is a television station in Salvador, Bahia, Brazil, affiliated with TV Brasil. The station is maintained by the Bahia Educational Radio Broadcasting Institute (IRDEB), a government body of the State of Bahia that is also responsible for radio station Educadora FM.

== History ==
The station was opened on November 9, 1985 by the Institute of Educational Broadcasting of Bahia (IRDEB), being the fifth television station to go on air in the state.

TVE Bahia gained its first affiliate in 1995, TV Cultura do Sertão, in Conceição do Coité. The Coiteense station was responsible for transmitting TVE programming to the city until 2017, when it ceased operations. In 2002, TV UESB was inaugurated, also a TVE Bahia affiliate. In 2003, its signal began to be relayed by TV Valente, in the municipality of Valente. Said station, however, was shut down by ANATEL in 2007.

In 2007, with the creation of TV Brasil, the broadcaster began broadcasting its programming in combination with TV Cultura. However, in 2009 it stopped airing the São Paulo-based station and passed to air all the programming of the network controlled by EBC.

In 2019, the station began a process of digitizing its signal in the interior of the state. Some of the first 58 cities to receive the signal were Feira de Santana, Guanambi, Ipiaú and Ipirá. The process continued in 2020. In the same year, the station joined Canal Futura, whose partnership lasted three years.

In 2025, the station began transmitting its programming on free-to-view satellite channel 222 of the Star One D2 satellite via Embratel's SAT HD Regional system throughout Brazil.

== Technical information ==
=== Subchannels ===
Channel	Video	Aspect	Short name	Programming
10.1	24 UHF	1080i	TVE Bahia / TV Brasil programming	
10.2	24 UHF	1080i	TV Educa Bahia / Canal Futura	
10.3	24 UHF	480i Widescreen	TV Kirimurê / TVT	
10.4	24 UHF	Rádio FM	Educadora FM	

The station began testing its digital signal in July 2013, and officially opened it on December 17, 2013. The broadcaster made its signal available in 1080i on channel 2.1 and in 480i on 2.2.

In January 2014, it received authorization from the Ministry of Communications (MiniCom) to operate the Citizenship Channel, aiming to provide two frequency bands of the digital signal (multiprogramming) for community television, being the first TV broadcaster in the country to operate this system, which was regulated in 2012.

On May 21, 2015, the station replaced the standard definition (SD) retransmission of the TVE Bahia signal with the TV Escola relay, on channel 2.2. On July 28, the station changed its virtual channel, going from 2.1 to 10.1. On February 14, 2017, channel 10.2 stopped broadcasting TV Escola programming and started showing TV Kirimurê programming, a channel run by the Children of the World Organization (FEME), with local programming and TV Escola itself.

=== Analog-to-digital conversion ===
The station shut down its analog signal on July 26, 2017, two months ahead of the ANATEL-mandated shutdown date for Salvador (September 27). The station ended its transmissions at midnight, leaving only its digital signal on the air.

== Programming ==
In addition to its relays of TV Brasil programming, TVE Bahia produces and airs the following local programs:

- Bem Bahia: Variety, with Vânia Dias;
- Giro Nordeste: News, with Juraci Santana;
- Palco TVE: Musical;
- Rural Produtivo: Rural news, with Karoline Meira;
- TVE Entrevista: Interviews, with Bob Fernandes;
- TVE Esporte: Sports news, with Valter Lima e Juliana Lisboa;
- TVE Notícias: News, with Jhonatã Gabriel;
- TVE Revista: News magazine, with Raoni Oliveira;

=== Sports ===
- Campeonato Baiano de Futebol
- Campeonato Baiano de Futebol - Segunda Divisão
- Copa 2 de Julho Sub-15 - Masculino
- São João da Bahia
