= TV Centro América Tangará da Serra =

TV Centro América Tangará da Serra (ZYA 941)
- Tangará da Serra, Mato Grosso; Brazil
- City: Tangará da Serra
- Channels: Digital: 36 (UHF); Virtual: 13
- Branding: TV Centro América

Programming
- Affiliations: TV Globo

Ownership
- Owner: Grupo Zahran; (Terra Comunicação Ltda.)

History
- Founded: February 8, 1991
- First air date: February 8, 1991
- Former names: TV Terra (1991–2001)
- Former channel numbers: Analog: 13 (VHF, 1991–2018)
- Former affiliations: Rede Manchete (1991–1997)

Technical information
- Licensing authority: ANATEL
- ERP: 6 kW
- Transmitter coordinates: 14°37′42.3″S 57°30′5″W

Links
- Public license information: Profile
- Website: redeglobo.globo.com/tvcentroamerica

TV Centro América Tangará da Serra is a Brazilian television station based in Tangará da Serra, a city in the state of Mato Grosso. It operates on channel 13 (UHF digital 36), and is affiliated to TV Globo. The station is part of TV Centro América, a television network that is part of Rede Matogrossense de Comunicação, and is the only microgenerator in the network, with its signal restricted to Tangará da Serra and nearby areas.

== History ==
The station was founded on February 8, 1991, as TV Terra, being affiliated with Rede Manchete. It was a component of the Pantanal Television Network, belonging to federal deputy Elvis Antônio Klauk, which was also made up of two more television stations in the interior of the state, affiliated with Rede Manchete: TV Vale do Jauru, from Mirassol d'Oeste, and TV Pantanal, from Cáceres.< In 1997, it was acquired by Rede Matogrossense de Televisão and became affiliated with Rede Globo on December 11. In 2001, it was renamed TV Centro América Tangará da Serra.

On October 15, 2014, a storm hit the city of Tangará da Serra, with winds reaching 140 km/h, causing extensive damage to numerous residential and commercial establishments. The TV Centro América transmission tower could not resist the strong winds and fell, leaving the channel off the air in the region. The transmission resumed early in the morning of the following day, at low power, on a provisional basis. TV Centro América's digital signal was compromised and viewers had difficulty receiving reception while a new, more modern and resistant tower was being erected. The construction of a new structure had already been planned since the start of digital signal testing in 2013.

== Technical information ==
Virtual channel	Digital channel	Screen	Content
13.1	36 UHF	1080i	TV Centro América/Globo's main schedule

On February 7, 2014, it became the first station to implement digital HDTV signals in the interior of Mato Grosso. The implementation process, however, began two years earlier, with the exchange of cameras and equipment, preparation of the team and a restructuring of the station's building. The transmission tests began in November 2013 and lasted three months, enough time to make the necessary adjustments to the signal and implement the Electronic Program Guide, while viewers could now enjoy the images in high definition.

Based on the decree for the transition of Brazilian TV stations from analogue to digital signals, stations in Tangará da Serra will cease transmissions on channel 13 VHF on December 31, 2023, following the official ANATEL schedule. However, the broadcaster decided to turn off its analog signal on July 31, 2022, complying with TV Centro América's order to turn off the analog signal in some cities.

== Programming ==
In addition to retransmitting national programming from TV Globo and state programming from TV Centro América, TV Centro América Tangará da Serra currently produces and broadcasts the following program:

- MTTV 1ª Edição: Telejornal, com Carol Lynch;

Former programs:

- Esportes da Terra
- Terra em Manchete (as a Manchete affiliate)

=== News operation ===
On November 4, 2013, the news program previously presented by journalists Theodora Malacrida and Daniela Santos got a new scenario and was presented by Kátia Krüger. Previously, there was a local edition of MTTV 1st Edition on Saturdays and MTTV 2nd Edition had the first block with local generation, but later the station started to produce only MTTV 1st Edition, since the second edition of the newscast includes news from across the state. The main news from Tangará da Serra and the region is broadcast on the state network on Bom Dia Mato Grosso and MTTV 2nd Edition, with recorded reports and live inserts.
