= TV Porto =

- Porto Seguro, Bahia; Brazil
- Channels: Digital: 33 (UHF)
- Branding: TV Porto

Programming
- Affiliations: TV Cultura

Ownership
- Owner: TV Porto

History
- First air date: December 2010
- Former channel numbers: 21 (analog, 2010-2016)
- Former affiliations: Rede Super (2010-2016) dark (2016-2023)

Technical information
- Licensing authority: ANATEL
- ERP: 0.11 kW
- Transmitter coordinates: 16°24′59.9″S 39°06′34.5″W

Links
- Public license information: Profile

TV Porto (channel 33) is a Brazilian television station licensed to Porto Seguro, Bahia. The station is owned by Fundesul and is a TV Cultura affiliate. Founded in December 2010, it is the first locally-licensed television station.

== História ==
=== Background (2002–2010) ===
On January 15, 2002, Fundação Fundesul, headquartered in Teixeira de Freitas and linked to pastor Eonaldo Soares Santos, of Catedral da Bênção, received a license to operate UHF channel 21 in the city of Porto Seguro. On February 6, 2003, the foundation was authorized to operate the station. On January 26, 2007, however, the license was suspended by the Judicial Branch in Eunápolis.

The decision was taken following the request for an injunction by the Federal Public Ministry in November 2006, which argued for the suspension due to the alleged lack of a bidding process. Even with the act, in 2008, Fundesul made test broadcasts relaying TVE Bahia, and was surveyed by ANATEL in order to continue its licensing process.

=== TV Porto Seguro (2010–2016) ===
In October 2010, it was announced that UHF channel 21 would operate as TV Porto Seguro, having evangelical programming. In December 2010, broadcasts officially began, this time as a Rede Super affiliate. Despite plans to produce local programming, TV Porto Seguro continued as a full relay of Rede Super until October 2016, when it interrupted its operations again.

=== TV Porto (2023–present) ===
On November 4, 2019, the entity obtained a new license in Porto Seguro, this time on digital UHF channel 33. Three years after receiving the grant, on July 22, 2023, the foundation resumed operating on the license in experimental format, relaying TV Cultura's national schedule.

On August 6, 2023, TV Cultura officially announced that the Porto Seguro station would be its new affiliate. On August 9, 2023, the station was officially relaunched as TV Porto, still without local programming, and became the network's only affiliate in inland Bahia, five years after the shutdown of TV Jequié.

On May 1, 2024, TV Porto announced the introduction of local programming. The programs were community journalism service Hora do Baianão, presented by Tiago Maciel, news bulletin Porto News and the main evening news service TV Porto Jornal. Hora do Baianão had its premiere announced for May 15, but only went on air on June 3.

The first local program shown as Porto Esportes, presented by Tany Santos, who also hosts a sports show on TVC in Potiraguá. The first edition of Porto News, presented by Julli Barra, aired on May 15.

== Programming ==
In addition to relaying TV Cultura's national schedule, TV Porto produces and airs the following programs:

- Abrolhos Rural: Agribusiness news with Marcio Barney;
- Hora do Baianão: Variety with Tiago Maciel;
- Porto Esportes: Sports news with Tany Santos;
- TV Porto Jornal: News with Luciana Bittencourt;
- TV Porto Notícias: News updates with Julli Barra.
