= TV Pantanal =

- Cáceres, Mato Grosso; Brazil
- City: Cáceres
- Channels: Virtual: 10
- Branding: TV Pantanal

Programming
- Affiliations: Record

Ownership
- Owner: Grupo Zahran; (TV Pantanal Ltda.)
- Sister stations: TV Descalvados

History
- Founded: 1992
- First air date: 1992
- Last air date: November 13, 2013
- Former affiliations: Rede Manchete (1992–1998)

Technical information
- Licensing authority: ANATEL
- ERP: 1 kW
- Transmitter coordinates: 16°04′47.5″S 57°42′03.7″W

Links
- Public license information: Profile

TV Pantanal (channel 10) was a Record-affiliated television station licensed to Cáceres, Mato Grosso. It shut down in 2013 after a political scandal, leaving its sister station TV Descalvados, an SBT affiliate, alone.

== History ==
=== Rede Manchete (1992–1998) ===
TV Pantanal was founded in 1992, as a Rede Manchete affiliate, forming part of Rede Pantanal de Televisão, a regional network of Manchete affiliates based in Cáceres, Tangará da Serra (TV Terra) and Mirassol d'Oeste (TV Vale do Jauru). The network was owned by the family of deceased federal deputy Elvis Antônio Klauk.

Still in 1992, it premiered Mercado Livre, presented by Sérgio de Oliveira. In addition, journalist Renan Coelho came in from Mirassol d'Oeste, from TV Vale do Jauru, to compose the new station's team, remaining for three years, before moving to TV Terra in Tangará. In 1997, the station was relayed entirely by TV Vale do Jauru, which had to end its local television production due to financial reasons.

=== Rede Record (1998–2013) ===
Facing a ratings loss in 1997 and a network crisis initiated in 1998, a substantial amount of affiliates left Manchete and as consequence of the crisis, the station joined Rede Record.

==== Sale to the Henry family (2004) ====
In May 2004, at the beginning of the electoral campaign where Ricardo Henry (PP) ran for the position of municipal mayor, against the then mayor and candidate for re-election, Túlio Fontes (PT) and relatives of Henry acquired TV Pantanal from the Klauk family. However, the purchase is the subject of controversy, as it had been made through a "drawer contract" with the former owners, Ervides Klauk and Jorge Souza, as the document was notarized at the Cuiabá Notary Service, but was not signed by the Henry brothers (Pedro and Ricardo) nor registered with the commercial board, to simulate that the property remained with Klauk and Souza. Later, the former owners simulated the sale of TV Pantanal to Sérgio Granja de Souza (former partner of Ricardo Henry at TV Descalvados) and Hélio de Souza Vieira Neto (son of Sérgio Granja). The family's intention was to have total control, through TV Pantanal and TV Descalvados, of journalistic coverage of that year's elections, thus preventing negative articles about Ricardo Henry from being broadcast on the Record affiliate, then controlled by political opponents. With the sale, it stopped relaying its programming to TV Vale do Jauru, which became a Rede Record relay station.

==== Suspension of local programming (2008) ====
On October 3, 2008, the Public Prosecutor's Office (PPO) determined the suspension of all of the station's local programming until the action requesting the cancellation of permission to operate the sound and image broadcasting service by the company was judged. In the decision, the Federal Court accepted that commercial slots that where already negotiated should not be suspended. For the Public Prosecutor's Office, it was proven that the Henry Family had held the radio broadcasting monopoly in Cáceres for years, which is prohibited by the Federal Constitution. In addition to TV Pantanal and TV Descalvados, the family members also controlled Rádio Clube de Cáceres. Due to a lack of local programs and commercials, TV Pantanal goes off the air, and the region is left without Rede Record programming.

==== Resumption of operations (2011) ====
On February 16, 2011, after over two years, TV Pantanal resumed its operations, this time as a full relay of TV Record Cuiabá. Under the control of businessman Sérgio Granja Vieira, TV Pantanal maintained a team of reporters to produce reports to be shown on the local programs of the Cuiabá station, with plans to resume production of local programs.

==== Suspension of the license and shutdown (2013) ====
On November 13, 2013, the Public Prosecutor's Office suspended the station's license. After the decision, the station was taken off air.

== Programming ==
In addition to relaying Rede Manchete and later Rede Record's national programming in their respective affiliations, TV Pantanal aired the following local programs over time:

- 4° Poder
- Cadeia Neles
- Cidade Alerta
- É Legal
- Jornal da Manhã
- Mercado Livre
- Pantanal Alerta
- Pantanal em Manchete
- Pantanal Sertanejo
