= Portishead =

Portishead may refer to:

- Portishead (band), a British band
  - Portishead (album), the 1997 album by Portishead
- Portishead, Somerset, a coastal town in North Somerset, England
  - Portishead power station
  - Portishead railway, a branch line closed in 1981
  - Portishead railway station, a former station
  - Portishead Town F.C.
- Portishead Radio, a maritime radio communications station based in Burnham-on-Sea, Somerset, England
