= Educadora FM =

Educadora FM (ZYC 299)

Salvador, Bahia; Brazil
- Frequency: 107.5 MHz

Programming
- Language: Portuguese

Ownership
- Owner: Bahia Educational Broadcasting Institute

History
- Founded: March 31, 1978

Technical information
- Licensing authority: ANATEL
- ERP: 59.82 kW
- Transmitter coordinates: 12°59′49.8″S 38°29′58.4″W

Links
- Public license information: Profile
- Webcast: Listen live
- Website: educadorafm.ba.gov.br

Educadora FM is a Brazilian radio station based in Salvador, Bahia. Its programming features diverse musical genres and content dedicated to Bahian culture. The station broadcasts on 107.5 MHz and is operated by the Bahia Educational Broadcasting Institute, an agency of the Bahia State Government.

== History ==
The radio station was inaugurated on March 31, 1978, and its first transmission took place a few days earlier, featuring a chord from the Paul Mauriat orchestra. The station emerged as an instrument of the Bahia Educational Broadcasting Institute, established in 1969, with the purpose of meeting, in Bahia, the demands of the distance education project, which was part of a strategy of the Brazilian military dictatorship. At that time, under the Projeto Minerva, radio stations were required to allocate five hours per week of their programming to radio lessons, aimed at combating illiteracy. Starting in 1987, with José Wilson Lopes Pereira taking over the station's direction, the station began investing in a wider range of musical styles, from classical music to Bahian music, abolishing the longstanding ban on foreign music by incorporating reggae, blues, jazz, salsa, black music, and rock.

From the beginning, the radio opened its programming to Bahian artists of diverse styles, especially those with little access to commercial stations. The station has annually promoted a music festival since 2003, featuring unpublished musical works. This initiative publicizes contemporary music production in Bahia and launches new talents into the music market.
