= Severiano Mário Porto =

Brazilian architect (1930–2020)

Severiano Mário Vieira de Magalhães Porto (Uberlândia, February 19, 1930 - Rio de Janeiro, December 10, 2020) was a Brazilian architect.

Known as the "architect of the forest", or "architect of the Amazon", he was responsible for designing a unique model of an Amazonian sustainable architecture, which combines techniques developed by ribeirinhos and caboclos with the most modern and innovative creations of architecture.

== Biography ==
Porto moved with his family to Rio de Janeiro, at the age of five, when his father founded Colégio Brasil América. He graduated from the National Faculty of Architecture (FNA), of the University of Brazil, in 1954. As a student he did an internship at Construtora Britto and as an architect responsible for the development of works he remained at the company for about eleven years. Porto travelled to Manaus for tourism in 1963. Two years later he was invited by the governor of the State of Amazonas, Arthur Cezar Ferreira Reis (1908-1993) - father of a colleague from Colégio Brasil América - to carry out the renovation of the government palace and the project of the Legislative Assembly of the State in 1965. While he remained in Manaus for the development of these projects, which did not materialize, Severiano Porto received other orders and then moved to the city in 1966. He maintained the office from Rio de Janeiro with the coordination of his partner, the architect Mário Emílio Ribeiro (1930), classmate of the FNA and co-author in important projects, like the Vivaldo Lima Stadium, 1965, the Campus of the University of Amazonas, 1970 / 1980, and the Pousada on Ilha de Silves, 1979/1983, all built in Amazonas. In Manaus, he drew up specifications, with engineers Sérgio S. Machado and Milber Guedes, to ensure that construction companies complied with deadlines and technical specifications according to the project and the legal provisions established. The unprecedented initiative in the state is assimilated by the government. Many of the projects developed in the region are awarded by the Institute of Architects of Brazil (IAB), such as the Chapéu de Palha Restaurant, 1967 (demolished), the Architect's Residence, 1971, and the Pousada da Ilha de Silves is awarded at the Buenos Aires International Architecture Biennial in 1985, and he reaches international renown, which is confirmed in 1987, when he was honored as the man of the year by the French magazine L'Architecture d'Aujourd'hui. Severiano and Ribeiro's partnership was recognized by the Personality of the Year award, which architects receive from the Rio de Janeiro department of IAB in Manaus. Severiano also served as a professor of architecture and urbanism at the Faculty of Technology of the University of Amazonas, from 1972 to 1998. After 36 years living in Manaus, the architect returned to Rio de Janeiro, and moved the office to Niterói, where he moved in. In 2003 he received the title of honorary professor at the Federal University of Rio de Janeiro.

== Death ==
Porto died on December 10, 2020, due to COVID-19 in Niterói.

== Works ==
- 1965 - Vivaldo Lima Stadium, Manaus
- 1967 - Chapéu de Palha Restaurant (demolished)
- 1969 - Buildings such as the headquarters of Petrobras
- 1971 - Headquarters of the Free Economic Zone of Manaus (Suframa, Manaus) ** Architect's Residence, Manaus
- 1973 - Campus of the University of the Amazon (UFAM)
- 1977 - School of Music and Clube do Trabalhador do Sesi, in Fortaleza
- 1978 - Robert Schuster Residence, Tarumã, Manaus
- 1979 - Pousada dos Guanavenas, Silves Island
- 1983 - Balbina Environmental Protection Center, Presidente Figueiredo
- 1992 - Urbanization Park of Ponta Negra, Manaus
- 1994 - Headquarters of Aldeia Infantil SOS (NGO linked to Unesco)
  - Headquarters of the Regional Labor Court (TRT)
  - Seat of the Justice Forum Henoch Reis
  - Campus of Unama, Belém
  - Prefabricated wooden school Elizabete Rodrigues de Campos

== Bibliography ==
- NEVES, Letícia de oliveira. Arquitetura bioclimática e a obra de Severiano Porto: estrategias de ventilação natural. São Carlos, 2006.
