= Pantanal Futebol Clube =

Football club in Corumbá, Brazil

Pantanal
- Full name: Pantanal Futebol Clube
- Founded: 13 December 1987; 37 years ago
- 2015: Sul-Mato-Grossense Série B, 8th of 8
Home colours	Away colours

Pantanal Futebol Clube, commonly referred to as Pantanal, is a Brazilian football club based in Ladário, Mato Grosso do Sul.

== History ==
In 1987, the club was founded under the name Ladário Futebol Clube. In 2003, the club was renamed to Ladário Pantanal Futebol Clube, then, in 2004 the club was renamed to Pantanal Futebol Clube.

== Stadiums ==
Pantanal Futebol Clube played in two stadiums, Estádio Arthur Marinho, which had a capacity of 5,000 people and is located in Corumbá, and Estádio Vicente Fortunato, which has a maximum capacity of 3,500 people and is located in Ladário.
