= Porto Vivo =

"Porto Vivo", literally translating to "Porto Alive", is the name for an urban rejuvenation project in Porto, Portugal. The Porto City Council, ("Camara municipal") established this project when the City old Town was designated a World Heritage Site by UNESCO during 1998.

== History ==
Porto City Council's officially appointed body, The Society of Urban Rehabilitation of Oporto, was created specifically to take charge of and carry out this project. They are located in the Sé district of Porto, on Rua Mouzinho da Silveira, in the heart of the protection zone. The society was constituted on 27 of November 2004. Its mission is to elaborate the strategy, and promote the program of urban rejuvenation in Porto, by acting as mediator between property owners and investors, between holders and tenants, and where needed, to take charge the operation of urban rehabilitation, using the lawful powers conferred to it by the City Council.

The overall aim of the rehabilitation program is to rehabitate, and breathe new life into the inner city (The "Baixa" district), and the historical centre of Porto. This involves renovation of much of the older, more neglected residential and other historically significant buildings, especially in the area bounded by the ancient city walls, defined by UNESCO as being a world heritage conservation zone during 1996.

== Objectives ==
The society has 5 declared objectives:

- To refurbish the buildings and structures of the City Centre.
- To revitalise the local economy of the City Centre.
- To renew and enhance the social aspects of the City Centre.
- To modernise the infrastructure of the City Centre.
- To facilitate efficient management of the renewed City Centre.

In addition to the many historical buildings renovated to date as part of Porto Vivo, the program has also yielded the Porto Metro, the upgrading & expansion of Francisco Sá Carneiro Airport, the construction of many new buildings including the Casa da Música theatre, the Infante Dom Henrique Bridge, and the upgrading of the Dom Luis I Bridge.
