= John Wesley Portis =

Member of the Alabama Legislature from the district
- In office 1843–1844

Personal details
- Born: January 1818 North Carolina, US
- Died: April 1902 (aged 84) Suggsville, Alabama, US
- Party: Democratic

Military service
- Allegiance: Confederate States
- Branch: Confederate States Army
- Rank: Colonel
- Battles: American Civil War; Second Battle of Corinth (WIA)

John Wesley Portis (January 1818 – April 1902) was a lawyer in antebellum Alabama and an officer in the Confederate States Army during the American Civil War, rising to become colonel of the 42nd Alabama regiment, which he led into battle at Corinth.

== Life ==
John Wesley Portis was born in January 1818, in Nash County, North Carolina; son of Ira Portis, who went from North Carolina to Clarke County in 1818, and settled near Suggsville, Alabama; grandson of John Portis, of Fishing Creek, Ransom's Bridge, Roanoke River, North Carolina; great-grandson of George Portis, who came from Wales and settled on the Isle of Wight, Virginia, in 1760, and was buried in the old Petersburg cemetery.

He was educated at the University of Virginia, and studied law in the office of Cooper & Parsons, at Claiborne. He was admitted to the bar; engaged in the practice of law and in planting at Suggsville; was elected to the State legislature from Clarke County as a mixed basis Democrat in 1843, and was re-elected in 1844. He was a trustee of the University of Alabama from 1844 to 1860.

On the beginning of the American Civil War in 1861, he volunteered as a private in the Confederate States Army, and was later elected a lieutenant in the 42nd Alabama regiment. A year later, he was elected colonel of the 42nd Alabama; led it at Corinth, where he was wounded; resigned soon afterwards and returned home.

After the war, he resumed the practice of law at Suggsville; served for some time as postmaster at that place; and engaged in merchandising to some extent. He was a Democrat, a delegate to the national conventions at Cincinnati, Charleston, and Baltimore, and a Methodist. His last residence was at Suggsville, where he died in early April 1902.

== Personal life ==
He was married to Rebecca Griffin, daughter of Richard Rivers, and by her had the following children:

1. Richard Rivers (October 24, 1845 – May 4, 1885), private in the Confederate States Army, 1864–1865, lawyer and merchant at Suggsville, married (1) Maimie Deas, (2) Mary Barnes;
2. Ira David (born October 24, 1845), private in the Confederate States Army, 1864–1865, lawyer at Suggsville, married Onie Mae Poole;
3. Ira Rivers (born May 24, 1847), private in the Confederate States Army, was graduated, M. D., from Tulane university, physician and planter in Smith County, Texas, until 1899, private, United States Army, Philippine War, 1898;
4. Emma;
5. Ella;
6. Mary;
7. Lucy.

== Sources ==
- Ball, T. H. (1882). A Glance Into the Great South-East, or, Clarke County, Alabama, and Its Surroundings, From 1540 to 1877. Grove Hill, AL: T. H. Ball. pp. 482–485.
- "Death of Col. Portis". Clarke County Democrat. April 10, 1902. p. 1.

Attribution:

- Owen, Thomas McAdory (1921). "Portis, John Wesley". Dictionary of Alabama Biography. Vol. 4. Chicago, IL: The S. J. Clarke Publishing Company. p. 1380.
