= Porta (surname) =

Porta is a surname of Italian origin. Notable people with the surname include:

- Antonio Porta (basketball), former Argentine-Italian professional basketball player
- Antonio Porta (author)
- Bernardo Porta (1758–1829), Italian composer active in France
- Bianca Della Porta (born 1991), Canadian ice hockey and rugby player
- Carlo Porta (1775–1821), Italian poet in the Milanese dialect
- Costanzo Porta (1528–1601), Italian composer of the Renaissance
- Elvio Porta (athlete) (born 1921), Argentine discus and hammer thrower
- Giacomo della Porta (1532–1602), Italian sculptor and architect
- Giambattista della Porta (1535–1615), Neapolitan physician and playwright
- Giovanni Porta (1675–1755), Italian composer
- Hugo Porta (born 1951), Argentine rugby union footballer
- Livio Dante Porta (1923–2003), Argentine engineer
- Luigi Porta (1800–1875), Italian surgeon
- Miquel Porta (born 1957), Spanish epidemiologist and scholar
- Richard Porta (born 1983), Uruguayan Australian footballer

== See also ==
- Porta (disambiguation)
- Porto (surname)
