= James V. Porto =

James Vincent Porto III is a physicist at the National Institute of Standards and Technology. He was the recipient of a Presidential Early Career Award for Scientists and Engineers in 2005. He was awarded the status of Fellow in the American Physical Society, after being nominated by their Division of Atomic, Molecular & Optical Physics in 2008, for "seminal studies of ultra-cold atoms in optical lattices with applications to quantum information, many-body physics, and condensed matter models, and for the invention of optical lattice techniques including a super-lattice for patterned loading, and a re-configurable lattice of double wells."

== See also ==
- List of fellows of the American Physical Society (1998–2010)
