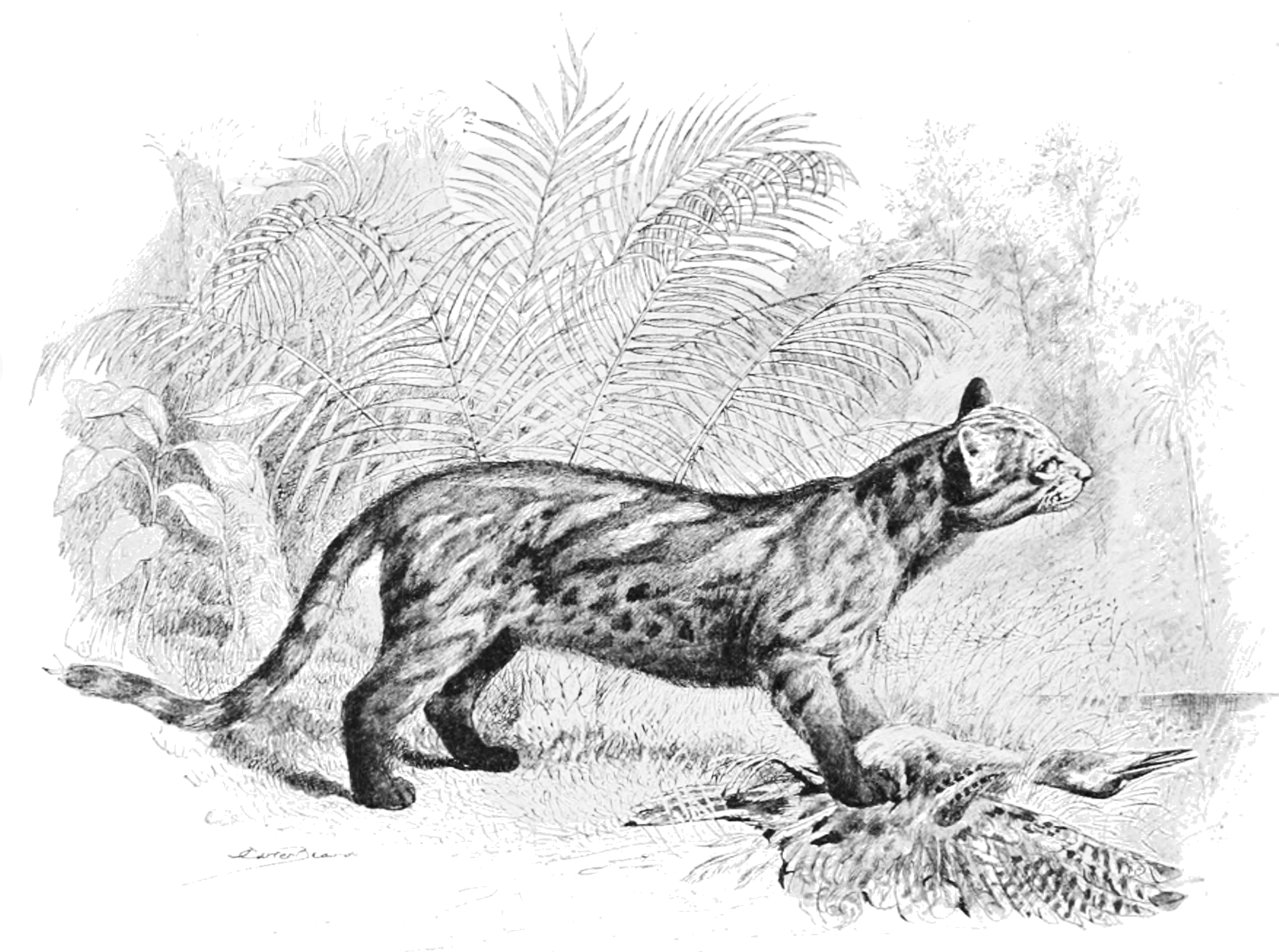

Scientific classification
- Kingdom: Animalia
- Phylum: Chordata
- Class: Mammalia
- Order: Carnivora
- Family: Felidae
- Genus: Leopardus
- Species: L. colocola
- Subspecies: L. c. braccatus

Trinomial name
- Leopardus colocola braccatus Cope, 1889

Synonyms
- Leopardus braccatus

= Pantanal cat =

Subspecies of carnivore

The Pantanal cat (Leopardus colocola braccatus) is a Pampas cat subspecies, a small wild cat native to South America. It is named after the Pantanal wetlands in central South America, where it inhabits mainly grassland, shrubland, savannas and deciduous forests.

== Characteristics ==
The Pantanal cat is brown agouti on the back with a little darker spinal crest. In the face it has two transverse dark lines across each cheek. Its ears are reddish on their base, creamy-white on the outer side and bordered with a black band. Its throat is whitish and blending into orangish towards the sides and on the belly. It has some dark brown rosettes on the flanks and stripes on the legs between elbow and wrist. The tip of the tail and paws are black. It is about the size of a domestic cat.

There is a single report of a wild melanistic individual from Brazil, although this coat pattern has also been observed in some captive specimens.

== Distribution and habitat ==
Pantanal cats are found from sea level to 2,000 metres (6,600 ft) in east-central Brazil, Uruguay, and neighbouring regions of central South America (Bolivia, Paraguay and Argentina). Within this region, they inhabit a range of habitats from open grassland to dense forest and dry forest, although they are specifically named for the Pantanal wetlands of Brazil, Bolivia and Paraguay. It has also been reported from agricultural land, and therefore must have some limited tolerance for human disturbance.

== Ecology and behaviour ==
The Pantanal cat is diurnal and solitary. It feeds on small mammals such as cavies, ground-dwelling birds, small lizards, and snakes. Home ranges are between 3 and 37 km^{2} (1.2 and 14.3 sq mi).

== Taxonomic history ==
In 1994, it was suggested that its distinct pelage colour, pattern and cranial measurements warrant a specific status. But results of phylogeographic analysis did not support this. The validity of the genetic work has been questioned.

Others regarded it as "likely [a] distinct species". In 2017, it was considered a subspecies of the Pampas cat by IUCN assessors.

In 2020, it was further recognized as a full species based on morphological, molecular, geographical, and ecological differences. One further population (L. munoai) traditionally recognized as a subspecies of the Pantanal cat when it is deemed distinct, has also been elevated to full species status.

Hybrids between the Pantanal cat and oncilla are known from Brazil.
