= TV Vila Real =

TV Vila Real (ZYQ 722)
Cuiabá, Mato Grosso; Brazil
- City: Cuiabá
- Channels: Digital: 38 (UHF); Virtual: 10

Programming
- Affiliations: Record

Ownership
- Owner: Grupo Gazeta de Comunicação; (TV Vila Real Ltda.)
- Sister stations: TV Pantanal

History
- First air date: November 26, 1993
- Former names: TV Gazeta (1993-2004); TV Record Cuiabá (2004-2016); RecordTV Cuiabá (2016-2017)
- Former channel numbers: Analog: 10 (VHF, 1993–2018)
- Former affiliations: CNT (1993-1997)

Technical information
- Licensing authority: ANATEL
- ERP: 5 kW
- Transmitter coordinates: 15°34′56″S 56°5′0″W

Links
- Public license information: Profile
- Website: www.gazetadigital.com.br/index.php/video/index

TV Vila Real (channel 10) is a Record-affiliated station licensed to Cuiabá, Mato Grosso. The station is owned by Grupo Gazeta de Comunicação, created in 1990 by businessman João Dorileo Leal, with the establishment of newspaper A Gazeta.

== History ==
The station was founded as TV Gazeta on November 26, 1993, as a CNT affiliate. The station was the first to provide local programming to air statewide, as the airtime for local programming on other stations in the area was limited. Four years after its founding, in 1997, the station joined Rede Record.

In 1998, TV Gazeta started delivering its signal by satellite and started airing its local programming to practically all municipalities of the state. In 2004, the station was renamed TV Record Cuiabá. In May 2007, the contract with Rede Record was renewed.

After the renewal, there were changes from the schedule, and, since then, around two and a half hours were allocated to local programming. On November 26, 2017, the day of its 24th anniversary, the station was renamed TV Vila Real, same name used by its sister radio station Vila Real FM and a reference to the original name of Cuiabá.

On January 31, 2020, it was announced that Alexandre Mota, former presenter of Balanço Geral RS, on RecordTV RS, left Rio Grande do Sul and moved to Cuiabá, to implement Balanço Geral MT on TV Vila Real.

== Technical information ==
Virtual channel	Digital channel	Screen	Content
10.1	38 UHF	1080i	TV Vila Real/Record's main schedule

The station's analog signal was shut down on VHF channel 10 on August 14, 2018, following the official ANATEL timeline.
